= Tagiuk Provider =

American gold-mining barge, launched 1982

Tagiuk Provider (MMSI number: 368052470; IMO callsign: WCW8211; USCG id: 650398), formerly Arctic Endeavor, is a 205 ft (62 m) 1500-ton ice-class flat-topped deck cargo barge adapted to being a clam-shell crane scoop mining platform for placer gold mining in the Bering Sea off Nome, Alaska, United States. The barge, a gold dredge, is owned by Tagiuk Gold, which previously ran scuba-diver-operated suction dredges for seafloor gold mining in the area. Tagiuk Gold is run by miner Andrew Lee, whose business running the barge is partially crowdfunded. Tagiuk Provider was profiled in an episode of Bering Sea Gold, at which time, it was the largest scoop dredge operating off Nome.

== Specifications ==
- Launched: 1982
- Dimensions: (L x W x D) 205 ft × 90 ft × 15 ft (62.5 m × 27.4 m × 4.6 m)
- Weight: 1500t
- Gross tonnage: 1900t
- Net tonnage: 1900t
- 3029 mtdw
- Spoon bow
- Tapered hull
- Ice step
- American Bureau of Shipping +A1 ice class

== Naming ==
- Tagiuk is an Eskimo/Inuit word meaning the sea, salt water, or saltiness. In the local Iñupiaq, it means the sea.

== History ==
The barge was built in 1982 at Gunderson Bros. shipyard of Portland, Oregon, USA. It was built for arctic port resupply, and was to have been pushed by two ocean-going tugs for that duty.

=== Arctic Endeavor (1982-2016) ===
The Arctic Endeavor was fitted out for resupply of offshore oil rigs off the coast of the North Slope of Alaska in the Beaufort Sea by FMC Corporation and completed in 1983, for Crowley Maritime Corporation. It would also be used to clear lanes of ice for access to those rigs. The barge was operated with a pair of Point-class 2100 horsepower tugboats, out of Prudhoe Bay, by Crowley Maritime. The Arctic Endeavor was built as part of an order for 5 barges.

In 1999, the barge was converted to ice-strengthened A1 classification, for operations as an oil response barge in the Beaufort Sea by Duwamish Shipyard.

For the 2007 open-sea drilling season, Arctic Endeavor, functioning as a support barge, was part of the Royal Dutch Shell exploratory fleet for the Beaufort Sea.

For the 2012 open-sea drilling season, Arctic Endeavor, functioning as an oil spill response barge, operated with the tug Point Oliktok, also working as an oil spill response ship, in the Royal Dutch Shell exploratory fleet for the Beaufort Sea, and homeported out of Nome.

For the 2014 open-sea drilling season, Arctic Endeavor, functioning as an oil spill response barge, operated with the tug Point Oliktok, also working as an oil spill response ship, in the Royal Dutch Shell exploratory fleet for the Chukchi Sea and based out of Dutch Harbor.

For the 2015 open-sea drilling season, Arctic Endeavor, functioning as an oil spill response barge, operated with the tug Sea Prince, also working as an oil spill response ship, in the Royal Dutch Shell exploratory fleet for the Chukchi Sea.

=== Tagiuk Provider (2016) ===
In 2016, the barge, then called Arctic Endeavour was sold to Tagiuk Gold by Crowley Marine Services in Seattle, Washington, USA; and renamed to Tagiuk Provider. It was moved to Olympia, Washington, USA, for refitting.

As of 2018, it became the largest scooping barge mining ship operating off Nome, exceeding the size of the prior largest, the Myrtle Irene. The barge overwintered in the ice at the Port of Nome for the 2018-2019 winter sea ice season.
