= Tuvli 160 =

Ocean-going barge

The Tuvli 160 (USCG id: 516564) is an ocean-rated crewed flat-topped barge in the process of being adapted into a powered littorals at-sea excavator-boomed suction dredge mining vessel. It is owned by Pomrenke Mining and its registered home port is Nome, Alaska, USA. The Tuvli 160 was featured in 2018 season 10 of Bering Sea Gold. Co-owner of Pomrenke Mining, Shawn Pomrenke, confirmed in July, 2022 that he had dropped the plans to rebuild the Tulvi 160, which he called the Mega Dredge, due to costs involved.

== Specifications ==
Vessel 2

- Launch date: 1968
- Length: 160 ft (49 m)
- Width: 45 ft (14 m)
- Depth: 10 ft (3.0 m)
- Net tonnage: 633 tons (bare)
- Gross tonnage: 825 tons (projected)
- Mining rate: 564 cu ft (16.0 m^{3}) per hour
- Mining depth: 80 ft (24 m)

== See also ==
- Myrtle Irene
- Christine Rose (dredge)
- AU Grabber
- Viking Dredge 1
- Viking Dredge 2
- Bima (dredge)
