= Christine Rose (dredge) =

The Christine Rose is a self-propelled barge excavator dredge used to mine Bering Sea placer gold deposits in the region around Nome, Alaska, US. It is operated and owned by Pomrenke Mining and its registered home port is Nome, Alaska, US. The Christine Rose is featured in the Discovery Channel USA mining reality TV show Bering Sea Gold.

== Specifications ==
Vessel 175265

- Launch date: 1941
- Length: 85.5 ft (26.1 m)
- Width: 21.5 ft (6.6 m)
- Depth: 4.1 ft (1.2 m)
- Net tonnage: 62 short tons (56 tonnes)
- Gross tonnage: 62 short tons (56 tonnes)

== See also ==
- Myrtle Irene
- Tuvli 160
- AU Grabber
- Viking Dredge 1
- Viking Dredge 2
- Bima (dredge)
