= AU Grabber =

The AU Grabber (pronounced as: Gold Grabber; (Note: "Au" is the chemical symbol for gold)) is a self-propelled barge excavator dredge used to mine Bering Sea placer gold deposits in the region around Nome, Alaska, USA. It is owned and operated by Richard Schimschat and featured in the Discovery Channel USA mining reality TV show Bering Sea Gold. It cost $600,000 to buy. In 2017 a 120-lb two-week-old seal was found on the dredge. Hank Schimschat retired from mining in 2019, and hired out the AU Grabber. Though no longer part of the show, in 2020, the dredge once again appeared on Bering Sea Gold, still mining in the Nome region. At the end of the 2020 season, while pulling out the dredge, it was improperly supported, bending the boat, ending its journey. The equipment of AU Grabber was moved to a new barge, the Mistress (stylized as Mistre$$), for the 2021 gold season.

== Specifications ==
Vessel 1031061

- Launch date: 1995
- Length: 78.8 ft (24.0 m)
- Width: 28 ft (8.5 m)
- Depth: 5 ft (1.5 m)
- Net tonnage: 92 short tons (83 tonnes)
- Gross tonnage: 92 short tons (83 tonnes)

== See also ==
- Myrtle Irene
- Tuvli 160
- Christine Rose (dredge)
- Viking Dredge 1
- Viking Dredge 2
- Bima (dredge)
