= Bima (dredge) =

Bucket-line dredge

The Bima (IMO number: 7633789) was a bucket-line dredge. It was built to mine tin in offshore Malaysia and Indonesia. In the late 1980s, it was moved to Nome, Alaska, US, to mine seafloor placer gold deposits in the Bering Sea off the coast. Being unprofitable at gold mining in Nome, it was sold for scrap in 1990. The barge is the largest barge to operate out of Nome for gold mining, being some 14 stories tall. The Bima was the last commercial-scale dredging operation to operate out of Nome at sea. Prior commercial-scale land-side bucket dredges had all already shutdown by the time Bima started up.

== Specifications ==
- Height: 14 stories
- Displacement: 15,000 ton
- Length: 565 ft (172 m)

== History ==
Bima was built in Singapore in 1976, by Billiton Mining, a subsidiary of Royal Dutch Shell, to mine tin off Malaysia. It was launched in 1979, to dredge tin ore in the seas off Indonesia. It was bought by Inspiration Gold Company for US$20 million, and moved to Alaska, to dredge gold in the Bering Sea off of Nome in 1986. As a gold dredge, it operated with a crew of 95, for two shifts of 48. It concluded its gold mining in 1990, and moved to Seattle, Washington, USA, to be auctioned off, as it had been unprofitable in mining gold, though it mined 130,000 oz (3,700 kg) of gold. At the time it was owned by Western Gold Exploration and Mining Co. of Golden, Colorado, USA; a subsidiary of Inspiration Resources Corp. of New York State, USA. It ended up being sold for scrap. The BIMA now resides in Juneau, Alaska and operates as a fuel barge for Allen Marine Tours.

== See also ==
- Myrtle Irene
- Tuvli 160
- Christine Rose (dredge)
- AU Grabber
