= List of Bering Sea Gold episodes =

Bering Sea Gold is an American reality series that was first broadcast on Discovery Channel on January 27, 2012. The show follows miners as they try to mine gold in Nome, Alaska, in the summer as well as winter season.

As of October 10, 2025, 234 episodes of Bering Sea Gold have aired.

== Series overview ==
| Year | Season Number | Episodes | Special(s) | Average U.S. viewers (million) | Originally aired | |
| Year | Season Number | Episodes | Special(s) | Average U.S. viewers (million) | Season premiere | Season finale |
|---|---|---|---|---|---|---|
| 1 | BSG S1 | 8 | 2 | 3.04 | January 27, 2012 | March 16, 2012 |
| 1 ICE | BSG:Under the Ice S1 | 5 | | 1.66 | August 24, 2012 | September 21, 2012 |
| 2 | BSG S2 | 12 | 2 | 2.20 | January 4, 2013 | March 29, 2013 |
| 2 ICE | BSG:Under the Ice S2 | 5 | | 2.16 | November 8, 2013 | December 6, 2013 |
| 3 | BSG S3 | 11 | | 2.36 | January 3, 2014 | March 14, 2014 |
| 3 ICE | BSG:Under the Ice S3 | 8 | | 2.22 | August 22, 2014 | October 3, 2014 |
| 4 | BSG S4 | 11 | | | March 13, 2015 | May 15, 2015 |
| 4 ICE | BSG S5 | 6 | | | September 4, 2015 | October 9, 2015 |
| 5 | BSG S6 | 10 | 2 | | March 30, 2016 | June 8, 2016 |
| 5 ICE | BSG S7 | 7 | | | August 26, 2016 | October 7, 2016 |
| 6 | BSG S8 | 10 | 2 | | February 1, 2017 | April 5, 2017 |
| 6 ICE | BSG S9 | 8 | 2 | | August 11, 2017 | November 29, 2017 |
| 7 | BSG S10 | 10 | 2 | | March 30, 2018 | June 15, 2018 |
| 8 | BSG S11 | 11 | 2 | | September 17, 2019 | November 12, 2019 |
| 9 | BSG S12 | 11 | 2 | | May 8, 2020 | October 9, 2020 |
| 10 | BSG S13 | 10 | 1 | | April 30, 2021 | July 2, 2021 |
| 10 ICE | BSG S14 | 10 | | | October 26, 2021 | December 28, 2021 |
| 11 | BSG S15 | 10 | 2 | | December 6, 2022 | February 7, 2023 |
| 12 | BSG S16 | 10 | | | August 1, 2023 | October 3, 2023 |
| 12 ICE | BSG S17 | 12 | | | October 6, 2023 | December 22, 2023 |
| 13 | BSG S18 | 12 | | | August 16, 2024 | October 18, 2024 |
| 14 | BSG S19 | 10 | | | August 8, 2025 | October 10, 2025 |

== Episodes ==
=== Season 1 (2012) ===
| No. overall | No. in season | Title | Original release date | US viewers (millions) |
|---|---|---|---|---|
| 1 | 1 | "Paydirt" | January 27, 2012 | 3.66 |
In Nome, Alaska, the gold rush is on. Meet the dredgers, driven by gold fever and sometimes desperate need, who pilot their ragtag dredges and dig with buckets or dive with hoses to suck up gold from the bottom of the frigid, unpredictable Bering Sea.
| 2 | 2 | "One Bad Deal" | February 3, 2012 | 3.73 |
A bar brawl threatens not only Shawn's health but the Christine Rose's future. The Wild Ranger's luck is getting worse as they're down a man and have sprung a leak. The Sluicey's Ian calls in a friend who offers both experience and criticism.
| 3 | 3 | "Suction" | February 10, 2012 | 3.48 |
The weather may be perfect, but storms are brewing onboard the dredges as egos clash and tempers flare. Emily's first dive is almost her last when she learns the dangers of dredging first-hand.
| 4 | 4 | "A Viking Funeral" | February 17, 2012 | 3.05 |
The season is halfway over, and tensions are running high as the dredgers search for new sweet spots. An accident with the 15 ton excavator threatens to end one deckhand's season.
| 5 | 5 | "Captaincy" | February 24, 2012 | 3.12 |
A season of simmering grievances comes to a boil. Wild Ranger owner Vern fires one of his crew. Emily falling overboard and a blocked sluice box test Zeke's patience. Rocks falling out of a faulty sluice box rain down on solo-diving Scott F's head.
| 6 | 6 | "Eureka" | March 2, 2012 | 2.77 |
Bad luck and bad vibes. The crews have a car accident on the way home from some hot springs R&R. A hastily welded winch roller gives way, releasing a cable that lashes Cody's leg and sends him overboard. Scott M. dives with an injured leg out of stubbornness.
| 7 | 7 | "Bad Vibrations" | March 9, 2012 | 2.24 |
The dredging season is quickly coming to an end, and so are once trusted relationships between Zeke and Emily as well as Scott F. and Ian. Shawn sends crewmember Robbi packing while Scott M. swallows his pride and invites Steve R. back. But will he accept?
| 8 | 8 | "The Bitter End" | March 16, 2012 | 2.28 |
Winter sets in. The now short-staffed crews try to go out once more before the ice blocks them in. Each on their own, Emily salvages and Scott M. finds salvation. The crews take their earnings and face off at an auction for next year's dredging grounds.

=== Season 1 ICE (2012) ===
| No. overall | No. in season | Title | Original release date | US viewers (millions) |
|---|---|---|---|---|
| 11 | 1 | "The Gold Don't Care" | August 24, 2012 | 1.95 |
The summer season over, 3 teams of miners dive under the ice to dredge gold on the floor of the Bering Sea. Two dredge teams struggle to winterize their operations, train their crews, and get the gold. But one new, scrappy crew of friends hits pay dirt.
| 12 | 2 | "Smoke Under Ice" | August 31, 2012 | 1.58 |
Shamrock's electrical fire forces a diver's emergency ascent. The Clark's rookie ice divers gasp for air. The Lazy Gator's Joe finds a huge "picker", but their operation grinds to a halt when an accidentally sucked up boulder clogs the hose.
| 13 | 3 | "All for Naught" | September 7, 2012 | 1.48 |
Halfway through the winter dredging season, tempers flare on The Clark. The Lazy Gator do a perilous freedive to try and recapture their only breathing apparatus, tangled underwater in a buoy. A new Shamrock diver tests his own nerve and Shawn's patience.
| 14 | 4 | "Fractures on The Mend" | September 14, 2012 | 1.64 |
Winter is on its way out. Shamrock's Vince gets one last chance. The Clark's Zeke gets pinned up under the ice when he loses his weight belt. A Lazy Gator tender nods off, unaware of diver Jesse's distress call when his hose gets caught on an ice chandelier.
| 15 | 5 | "Leads to an End" | September 21, 2012 | 1.67 |
With the winter dredging season coming to a close, the crews scramble for one more dive before the cracking shifting ice sinks their operation or worse, traps a miner down below. The Clark's Zeke loses his weight belt and is pinned up underneath the ice.

=== Season 2 (2013) ===
==== Pre-Season Special ====
| No. overall | Title | Original release date | US viewers (millions) |
|---|---|---|---|
| 16 | "Back To The Dredge" | December 28, 2012 | 1.95 |
Preview of the new season.

==== Regular season ====
| No. overall | No. in season | Title | Original release date | US viewers (millions) |
|---|---|---|---|---|
| 17 | 1 | "Point of No Return" | January 4, 2013 | 2.90 |
The Pomrenkes get off to a bad start with family squabbles and a $25K bill. Zeke and Scott have powerful new dredges, but can they rely on their crew of friends? Vernon goes all in, gambling all his savings and his deckhand daughter.
| 18 | 2 | "Dead Men Gather No Gold" | January 11, 2013 | 2.61 |
Edge dredger John is out of the hospital and on the gold, but Zeke may lose it all when accused of claim jumping. Scott puts the crew at risk taking the dredge out during a storm. The DNR shuts the Pomrenkes down. 'Hurricane Dave's' antics test Vernon.
| 19 | 3 | "Nice Guys Finish Last" | January 18, 2013 | 2.61 |
Summer storms keep the miners off the water; losing time and money shortens tempers. Steve R. takes out a restraining order against Scott and later finds gold. Zeke proves he wasn't claim jumping but gets shut down any way. Steve P. works his "voodoo".
| 20 | 4 | "Gold Gettin' Hound Dog" | January 25, 2013 | 2.91 |
Big swells and bigger tempers take over the Bering Sea. Inexperience and equipment problems cause more than a few tantrums, while big swells and bad conditions make some miners lose their lunch.
| 21 | 5 | "Greedy People" | February 1, 2013 | 2.57 |
The weather sours, crew members drop like flies, and captains' tempers rage. Scott goes out without his crew but hits a honey hole. Zeke goes back to The Clark and gets too close to a neighbor's lease. The Christine Rose is close to toppling over in a gale.
| 22 | 6 | "No Snivelin" | February 8, 2013 | 2.69 |
Pressure mounts as the fleet reaches the season's halfway mark. The Edge is hampered by toxic fumes and diving phobia. The Wild Ranger enters a turf war. The Pomrenkes face the law. Will Scott's binge finally bring about his breakdown?
| 23 | 7 | "Dirtville" | February 15, 2013 | 2.39 |
The season's end is steadily approaching, and every miner's back is against the wall. With debts mounting and feuds escalating, one deckhand has a near miss, a skipper loads his rifle, another blows his stack, and yet another abandons his crew before hightailing it out of Nome.
| 24 | 8 | "Go Big or Go Home" | March 1, 2013 | 1.78 |
Scott disappears out of Nome, leaving his crew in the lurch. Vernon's own crew and daughter go missing. Emily's joke to Zeke sets off their powder keg of frustrations. The Pomrenkes train their third generation dredger.
| 25 | 9 | "Don't Tell Me to Chillax!" | March 8, 2013 | 1.81 |
Shawn surrenders to the big house while his dad marathons to make $90K for the land payment deadline. Nome crowns the fastest gold panner. Steve R. finds himself in a competition to save his job. Despairing Zeke watches the gold season and his equipment drift away.
| 26 | 10 | "Gold Stress" | March 15, 2013 | 2.14 |
Only the most desperate mine as bad weather shadows the close of the season. The importance of adequate topside deckhands is undervalued. Verne's deckhand skills prove weak while Emily's are discounted, meanwhile all of the Anchor Management crew have had enough for the season and end up leaving Nome.
| 27 | 11 | "And No More Shall We Part" | March 22, 2013 | 2.09 |
The psychological toll of hazardous mining claims a victim. Vernon alters his staff roster. Scott returns, needing to also find a new diver as well. The Pomrenke's delivery is near the threshold of breakeven but deckhands hope for more good weather to increase their shares.
| 28 | 12 | "The American Dream" | March 29, 2013 | 1.86 |
Nome harbor ice deters most from venturing out. For those that brave the poor weather, inadequate underwater mining visibility ends the summer production. The Pomrenke's crew take their earnings.

=== Season 2 ICE (2013) ===
| No. overall | No. in season | Title | Original release date | US viewers (millions) |
|---|---|---|---|---|
| 30 | 1 | "We Are Gonna Be Golden" | November 8, 2013 | 1.95 |
The five crews take to the ice. Zeke's new well-oiled crew is on the gold, so they shut out late-arrival Emily. She joins her "gung-ho" dad, Steve, who after a single unproductive dive, boasts and wagers Vernon. Vernon, on day-one, drops a diver. Nome's angriest dredger, Scott, returns with a new dredge and attitude - but will it last?
| 31 | 2 | "Dozers and Dragons" | November 15, 2013 | 2.03 |
Zeke gambles on a new dredger with game-changing technology, but will his crew still be on the gold. After their first session of diving locates no paydirt, Emily chafes under her dad's laidback management style and challenges his captaincy. She also tangles with Shawn, who is finally in the money, trying to buy a key piece of equipment out from under him. Also without success, Vernon's team questions his methods. Scott's shop yields a required daily result.
| 32 | 3 | "No Fuel to Burn" | November 22, 2013 | 2.12 |
At the midseason point, patience is thin. Scott's dredge is literally running on fumes, but even with a near drowning, produces the requisite daily quota. Cocky newcomer Glen clashes with Zeke over manpower and equipment scheduling. Emily's fed up over breakdowns and absent dive time as her father collects an unearned vacation. Shawn's paystreak stretches out of reach. Vernon's limited expertise disquites the team as they see a meager first result.
| 33 | 4 | "Waterfalls of Gold" | November 29, 2013 | 2.19 |
Pressure mounts as days get warmer. It is parent vs. child as Shawn and Emily try to prove their captaincy skills to their fathers. After months of non-stop work without taking time to grieve his best friend's death and now accidents on the current winter site, Zeke finally reaches his breaking point while his team empties the trash. Scott works a crawl space. Vernon's divers cannot locate paydirt.
| 34 | 5 | "The Thaw" | December 6, 2013 | 2.50 |
The dredgers race to put in one last dive before the ice melts from under them. Shawn blows a gasket. Scott does so also. Zeke's most profitable season has taken its toll. Emily goes to drastic measures to earn her crew's and her own self respect. Steve faces Vernon to settle their bet.

=== Season 3 (2014) ===
| No. overall | No. in season | Title | Original release date | US viewers (millions) |
|---|---|---|---|---|
| 35 | 1 | "Fire and Icebergs" | January 3, 2014 | 2.21 |
The summer dredging season begins. The Pomrenkes compete with a new megadredge named AU Grabber owned by Hank Schimschat. The Pomrenkes' gold gain is overshadowed by exhausted equipment. Hank labors with assembly. Emily, the dredge owner, purchases a faulty motor. Zeke seems oblivious to returning to production. Steve R. is the first out, but employee attitude and behavior & underwater visibility hamper his yield. Vernon has no deckhands or divers. Glen LeBaron plays hide and seek.
| 36 | 2 | "Off the Deep End" | January 10, 2014 | 2.25 |
Steve R.'s only appearance is to worry about Zeke. Steve P. has to call for help when rough seas and rusting equipment break the Christine Rose, pinning it to the ocean floor. Emily's comments during her short inaugural dive provoke her crew to question her aptitude. Vernon initiates a new crew as he laments his financial woes. Hank's operation begins, but he wonders if tardy Scott can be useful. Rumors swirl, but Zeke tells the full story of his disturbing night in jail and the hospital.
| 37 | 3 | "Burn It Down" | January 17, 2014 | 1.86 |
It's beautiful dredging weather, but things are getting ugly. The Pomrenkes get help from the sea in unpinning their barge, then get help from fellow megadredger Hank who lends them a spud and sweats the small details of clean-up, while Scott again demonstrates his vanishing act. Zeke's recent incarceration leaves him in financial drought and he demands Emily pay up or give up her dredge. The Minnow's crew fights off claim jumpers in the public mining area, but face a setback when a compressor design flaw impedes diver safety. Steve R. and Glen search for The Dragon.
| 38 | 4 | "Let the Games Begin" | January 24, 2014 | 2.28 |
An unexpected visit from the Coast Guard doesn't go well for two dredges. Hank's megadredge is close to claim jumping on the Christine Rose's honey hole but the Pomrenkes' GPS says that the area is paydirtless tailings.
| 39 | 5 | "Who's the Captain?!" | January 31, 2014 | 2.51 |
The weather isn't all that cooperative, which slows some operations down. Emily thinks she's on the gold, however one of her divers get injured. The Pomrenkes gets a decent cleanout, and they also get to laugh at the AU Grabber trying to find the gold. Zeke continues to wrestle with his issues, and Steve continues to deal with mutiny amongst the Minnow's crew. Vernon continues to avoid the gold.
| 40 | 6 | "10 Lbs of Gold" | February 7, 2014 | 2.38 |
The weather is good and almost everyone is dredging. Emily complains of not making enough and needing to get on the gold; most of her income this year has been to pay off Zeke. Glen still can't find his Dragon and reluctantly begins working on the Minnow. Vernon is facing the end of the line, while the Pomrenkes crew stays solidly on the gold. Scott gets back to work on the AU Grabber, but his return may be short-lived.
| 41 | 7 | "Backhoe Wars" | February 14, 2014 | 2.69 |
While Hank tests Mother Nature by staying out dredging in the storm, Shawn races to bring his dredge home. Scott manages to get fired...again. Emily and Glen head far inland to river dredge. Left on their own back in Nome, her crew sows seeds of mutiny. Kris almost drowns from faulty equipment and Steve R.'s inattention.
| 42 | 8 | "Money Money Money" | February 21, 2014 | 2.70 |
With the new backhoe fully operational, Shawn is out to prove he is 'Mr Gold'. Vernon's promises and Emily's apologies do nothing to convince their crews to return. Zeke returns with a tasty new way to make it rich in Nome. He also puts an end to his friendship with the Riedel family.
| 43 | 9 | "Mr Gold & the New Kid" | February 28, 2014 | 2.14 |
The two megadredges race to reach a contested claim site. Hank wins the race, but Shawn gets the last laugh. Emily heads out with her new, poached crew. The Kellys almost come to blows when accused of claim jumping. Glen's engineering genius pays off big.
| 44 | 10 | "The Rescue and the Repo" | March 7, 2014 | 2.20 |
Late summer's worsening weather drives the dredges reluctantly off their honey holes and finally breaks the Kellys, who tell Steve R. they quit, while he loses Minnow to the repo man, Glen finally finds his Dragon. Hank wagers Shawn an ounce of gold.
| 45 | 11 | "The Final Showdown" | March 14, 2014 | 2.37 |
As Nome Harbor freezes over, the crews head out for one last chance at success. It's the battle of the barges as Hank's wager with Shawn sees its conclusion. Zeke returns to the water. Can Emily pay him off once and for all? The Kellys return with their Reaper.

=== Season 3 ICE (2014) ===
| No. overall | No. in season | Title | Original release date | US viewers (millions) |
|---|---|---|---|---|
| 11 | 1 | "Gold Luck" | August 22, 2014 | 1.95 |
Miners risk their lives diving below the ice on the frozen Bering Sea for a fortune in gold. We also catch up with Steve Riedel, who is now working full-time, as a kitchen porter in a local restaurant, trying to earn enough money, to buy another dredge in time for the summer season.
| 46 | 2 | "Motherlode" | August 29, 2014 | 2.05 |
The hard reality of the winter season begins to set in. Partnerships become strained as tempers and egos flare on the Wild Ranger and Reaper dredges, while Andy nearly loses his life, Vernon hits his biggest payday ever.
| 47 | 3 | "Gold from the Deep" | September 5, 2014 | 2.13 |
The dangers of working under the ice are starting to become glaringly apparent to the fleet's greenhorns and veterans.
| 48 | 4 | "The Champagne Kiss Off" | September 12, 2014 | 2.20 |
It's getting late in the ice mining season and the challenges of finding gold are wearing on the miners. Tensions run high and some important relationships are beginning to fray.
| 49 | 5 | "Grounds for Divorce" | September 19, 2014 | 2.26 |
Gold fever is on the rise as the season's end draws near. The deep waters of the Bering Sea put Zeke's health at risk and his partnership with Glen on the rocks.
| 50 | 6 | "Let the Gold Games Begin" | September 26, 2014 | 2.31 |
Time is running out for the ice mining fleet, and competition is on the rise. The lure of gold has already pitted one partnership against each other, will it infect others. After Zeke and Glen mutually agree to end their partnership, Zeke sets up his own operation with Sarah in the form of his old dredge The Clark again, after both being paid-off their earnings in gold, for their time, with Glen.
| 51 | 7 | "Are We Rich?" | October 3, 2014 | 2.35 |
With temperatures rising and the Bering Sea melting, time is running out for the fleet of gold dredgers. As the ice begins to fracture, the Miss Nomer team sees their dream of getting on the gold float out to sea.
| 52 | 8 | "Sunken Treasure" | October 3, 2014 | 2.52 |
Summer encroaches, and the Bering Sea ice shelf begins to break up - putting every dredge at risk. As the ice season comes to an end, the fleet scrambles for their last pans of gold. While Vernon, Shawn, Glen, Brad and Zeke met their goals, Emily continued to struggle.

=== Season 4 (2015) ===
| No. overall | No. in season | Title | Original release date | US viewers (millions) |
|---|---|---|---|---|
| 53 | 1 | "Good Morning, Viet-Nome" | March 13, 2015 | 2.01 |
The summer season kicks off as the Captains race to reclaim the gold the melting ice forced them to leave behind. One miner returns with a dastardly plan, while a rocky father and son relationship turns explosive.
| 54 | 2 | "Escape Goat" | March 20, 2015 | 1.76 |
As a storm closes in on Nome, tensions rise in the fleet. While the dredgers battle rough seas to get the gold, Shawn disagrees with Steve's dream to go mining inland.
| 55 | 3 | "Namby-Pamby Mugwumps" | March 27, 2015 | 1.77 |
The summer mining season heats up and everyone is feeling the pressure to get gold. A near-fatal mishap and personnel problems plague the fleet, proving once again that the Bering Sea doesn't give up her gold easily.
| 56 | 4 | "No Man Left Behind" | April 3, 2015 | 1.71 |
The summer season is well underway, but pressure to get gold is turning the miners against each other. Steve's inland mining plan may lead to breaking up the Pomrenkes' family business.
| 57 | 5 | "Daddy Driving a Caddy" | April 10, 2015 | 1.67 |
At midseason, the self-proclaimed best dredger in Nome is quitting the fleet. And although Brad welcomes a baby girl into his family, complications of the birth may claim the life of her mother.
| 58 | 6 | "Brokedown City" | April 17, 2015 | 1.92 |
Rough conditions on the Bering Sea are taking their toll on men and machines. A breakdown strands the AU Grabber at sea, whilst one of Emily's divers realises he's too broke to continue dredging.
| 59 | 7 | "I Quit!" | April 24, 2015 | 1.43 |
Bonds are tested and broken as two family teams split up. On the Eroica, Emily struggles to discipline her only diver and it backfires on her. But disaster turns into opportunity as Kris buys half of a dredge.
| 60 | 8 | "Smoke 'Em Out" | May 1, 2015 | 1.28 |
The gloves are coming off as the fleet fights for their season goals. Captains Vernon Adkison and Captain Emily Riedel look for last-minute new hires to get them the gold as the summer starts to come to an end.
| 61 | 9 | "The Battle for Tomcod" | May 8, 2015 | 1.63 |
Four crews rush to clean out the gold-rich Tomcod claim and an all-out gold war ensues. Meanwhile, Captain Emily Riedel and her new diver face a battle all their own.
| 62 | 10 | "Payback" | May 15, 2015 | 1.69 |
The season freezes to a halt as the dredges rush out for their final push for gold. One family reunites, as another falls apart and revenge, like the beginning of winter, is served cold.

=== Season 5 (2015) ===
| No. overall | No. in season | Title | Original release date | US viewers (millions) |
|---|---|---|---|---|
| 63 | 1 | "Countdown to Gold" | September 4, 2015 | 1.72 |
As the Department for Natural Resources (DNR) shortens the winter season from 8 down to 6 weeks, Vern tries out Derek's new dredging machine. Elsewhere, Shawn explores the wilderness for hot spots and Emily works with a team of female divers.
| 64 | 2 | "Girl Drama" | September 11, 2015 | 1.82 |
With a shortened ice mining season, every second counts. But just as the fleet seems set to dial in on the gold, their equipment doesn't have the same idea.
| 65 | 3 | "The Quest" | September 18, 2015 | 1.75 |
Near the mid-point of the shortened mining season, every dredge must hustle to stay on the gold, but in their mission setbacks cause trouble for the miners as they are about to bring in the gold.
| 66 | 4 | "Baggage" | September 25, 2015 | 1.70 |
The pressure is on to bring up more gold as the shortened season goes over its midway point. But pushing the dredges too hard leads to massive problems that could threaten the whole operation.
| 67 | 5 | "The Blizzard" | October 2, 2015 | 1.84 |
With less than a week remaining in the shortest ice mining season on record, every crew is battling the clock. But just when they think it couldn’t get any harder, a massive Arctic storm descends on Nome.
| 68 | 6 | "The Deadline" | October 9, 2015 | 1.67 |
With the end of the season in sight, one day remains for the miners to prove that the risks they took over the past month were worth the cost.

=== Season 6 (2016) ===
| No. overall | No. in season | Title | Original release date | US viewers (millions) |
|---|---|---|---|---|
| 69 | 1 | "Digging Deep" | March 23, 2016 | N/A |
After five seasons on the Bering Sea, we recap the struggles and triumphs of the Pomrenke family, the star-crossed lovers Zeke and Emily, Vernon’s various crew issues, and the chaos that is the Fightin’ Kellys.
| 70 | 2 | "The Gamble" | March 30, 2016 | 1.46 |
With the mining grounds picked clean, the fleet bets it all on new tech, new claims, and new opportunities. Shawn must deal with dad before hitting the Bluff, Brad attempts to bring his family back together with the promise of an adventure.
| 71 | 3 | "Pressure" | April 6, 2016 | 1.41 |
With the season in full swing, every dredge must quickly adjust to new situations in order to stay on the gold. Shawn brings in family to help reach his goal before heading to the Bluff, the Kellys try to get familiar with their new claims.
| 72 | 4 | "Golden Dreams" | April 13, 2016 | 1.28 |
Before Shawn can head to the Bluff, he must contend with another setback on the Christine Rose. While Derek finds out what the baddest dredge in Alaska can really do, Vernon hatches a plan to steal a boat from an old enemy.
| 73 | 5 | "Father's Day" | April 20, 2016 | 1.39 |
Mining is a family business, which means Father’s Day in Nome has a whole new meaning. While Shawn looks to give his dad a golden gift for the inland mining operation, he pauses to pass on a dive lesson to his own son.
| 74 | 6 | "Rock Bottom" | April 27, 2016 | 1.28 |
Corporate bosses force Zeke into an unlikely partnership. Shawn is desperate for gold, torn between his father’s inland dreams and his venture on the bluff. The Kellys hope to salvage their season. Vern finally sinks his dredge.
| 75 | 7 | "Breaking Point" | May 4, 2016 | 1.13 |
A lack of gold has everyone on edge. Shawn’s dad breaks his word, leading to a massive family eruption. Emily gets news that could end her season. On the brink of financial ruin, Vern and Derrick risk everything to keep dredging.
| 76 | 8 | "Teamwork" | May 11, 2016 | 1.21 |
After a blowup at the inland mining site has father and son on the outs, the Pomrenkes must reunite or risk losing the operation. Over at the High Noon, a grave mistake puts Derek and the dredge in danger, forcing him to call for help.
| 77 | 9 | "Turf War" | May 18, 2016 | 1.18 |
While Shawn Pomrenke prepares to head to the Bluff, his old rival, Derek McLarty, attempts to pull one over on Mr. Gold. As for Steve Pomrenke, the first cleanup of the inland mining operation will finally prove the old man right or wrong.
| 78 | 10 | "All In" | May 25, 2016 | 1.36 |
After a season of waiting, Shawn finally takes the Christine Rose down to the Bluff. Back in Nome, Vernon needs to hit it big or risk losing his $200,000 investment, while Zeke and Emily manage to find common ground.
| 79 | 11 | "Jackpot" | June 1, 2016 | 1.47 |
After a bust at the Bluff, Shawn returns to Nome early to find Derek on his spot, setting up a showdown at the High Noon. As the final gold hauls are tallied, Steve finds out whether or not his inland dream was worth the work.
| 80 | 12 | "The Gold Bar" | June 8, 2016 | 0.88 |
The epic 2015 summer mining season has come to an end. We've brought Steve & Shawn Pomrenke, the Kellys, Zeke Tenhoff and Emily Riedel, Derek McLarty & Vernon Adkison to the historic Gold Dust Saloon to air their grievances and share their memories.

=== Season 7 (2016) ===
| No. overall | No. in season | Title | Original release date | US viewers (millions) |
|---|---|---|---|---|
| 81 | 1 | "Virgin Ground" | August 26, 2016 | 1.28 |
This season, a modern day gold rush is sparked when Shawn Pomreinke offers the fleet access to his virgin claim of untouched Bering Sea floor, rumored to contain 14 millions of dollars of gold. But access comes at a price.
| 82 | 2 | "Fear the Reaper" | September 2, 2016 | 1.15 |
When Zeke's custom sluice malfunctions, Emily must step up to try and save the Clark's season. The Kelly clan moves in too close to Vernon's claim and Mr. Gold races to plug a hole that's threatening to devastate his budding empire.
| 83 | 3 | "The Plague" | September 9, 2016 | 1.42 |
With the ice season in high gear, a flu hits the dredgers like a plague threatening to knock every operation out of the race. For the Pomrenkes, a mistake by father Steve could thwart their inland dreams and end their quest for empire.
| 84 | 4 | "Double Jeopardy" | September 16, 2016 | 1.20 |
Halfway through ice season, desperation kicks in. Teams risk it all, bringing in experimental equipment and infamous ex-employees in their quest to double production. But will the gambles pay off or will the crews lose everything?
| 85 | 5 | "Backseat Diver" | September 23, 2016 | 1.25 |
With two weeks left in the season, the window to mine gold is closing. Zeke's experiment with a double length hose puts his brother in danger. The High Noon's water heater suffers a lethal malfunction and tempers boil at the Wild Ranger.
| 86 | 6 | "Lady Luck" | September 30, 2016 | 1.21 |
With nine days left, desperation and opportunity set the tone in Nome. A double sluice and lack of divers mean that Emily Riedel must confront her deepest fear if the Clark is to succeed. Shawn Mr. Gold Pomrenke discovers the land sale of a lifetime.
| 87 | 7 | "Hello Heartache, Goodbye Nome" | October 7, 2016 | 1.24 |
With three days left in the season, miners push themselves to the brink. Sleep, safety, and sanity are out the window in order to dredge maximum gold. Shawn Pomrenke's master plan is about to pay out.

=== Season 8 (2017) ===
| No. overall | No. in season | Title | Original release date | US viewers (millions) |
|---|---|---|---|---|
| 88 | 1 | "Uncharted Waters" | February 1, 2017 | 1.49 |
As the 2016 summer mining season begins, gold in Nome is drying up, pushing miners to extreme new locations in a desperate search for gold. Zeke heads miles off shore to Sledge Island while Shawn seeks to build his empire with a new claim at the Bluff.
| 89 | 2 | "Cruel Summer" | February 8, 2017 | 1.49 |
The miners of Nome continue their far flung explorations in search of new gold. Zeke and Emily head to Sledge Island and Shawn continues his dreams of gold at the Bluff. Meanwhile, the Kelly's reputation may sink them before the season starts.
| 90 | 3 | "Hail Mary" | February 15, 2017 | 1.39 |
Desperate to find new gold, Shawn pushes himself and his equipment to the limit. At Sledge Island, the deeper water triggers dangerous side effects for Zeke. The Kelly's go upriver for a shot at redemption.
| 91 | 4 | "Proving Day" | February 22, 2017 | 1.57 |
Shawn's obsession with the bluff reaches a breaking point. Zeke and Emily have enough fuel for one more trip to Sledge Island. It must pay off. Undeterred by obstacles, Nome newcomer George Young seeks his fortune on the Bering Sea floor.
| 92 | 5 | "Fickle Fortune" | March 1, 2017 | 1.29 |
Halfway through the season, Shawn Pomrenke needs massive gold at the Bluff or his empire will be ruined. After the debacle at Seldge Island, Zeke and Emily reach a breaking point. Buried in debt, Nome newcomer George Young remains optimistic.
| 93 | 6 | "Reaper Madness" | March 8, 2017 | 1.25 |
Anxious to reverse his fortunes, Zeke undertakes a perilous solo dive. The Kellys risk a thirteen-mile trip in their rinky-dink dredge. George is desperate to prove he's a capable diver before his brother leaves Nome.
| 94 | 7 | "Down and Out" | March 15, 2017 | 1.30 |
A back injury hobbles Shawn. Kris puts the Kellys on gold, but the claim owner has second thoughts. George is in a tight spot when getting gold means defying his brother.
| 95 | 8 | "Penny Dreadful" | March 22, 2017 | 1.13 |
At the mouth of the Penny River, Emily saves Zeke from a generator fire. Kris strikes a devil's bargain with the last willing claim owner in Nome. George loses his ace diver and brings his son, Landen, up to dredge in the dangerous Bering Sea.
| 96 | 9 | "Murky Waters" | March 29, 2017 | 1.06 |
Injured, Shawn depends on his crew and the mercy of the murky Bering Sea to salvage the empire. Zeke and Emily land on a career-saving spot but toxic fumes threaten more than their season. George faces a final dive and cleanout to determine his fate.
| 97 | 10 | "No Place Like Nome" | April 5, 2017 | 1.10 |
The Pomrenkes battle land and sea to vie for new gold-rich mining ground. Desperate, Zeke and Emily risk life and careers in a dangerous boating maneuver. Kris has one last chance to prove his Captaincy and mining skill if he wants to stay in Nome.

=== Season 9 (2017) ===
| No. overall | No. in season | Title | Original release date | US viewers (millions) |
|---|---|---|---|---|
| 100 | 1 | "Gold Getters" | August 4, 2017 | 0.73 |
Shawn's million dollar Bluff claim is denied, leaving the grounds open to anyone. Kris Kelly leaps at the opportunity, dragging his family across 70 miles of frozen tundra to what he hopes will be their biggest season yet.
| 101 | 2 | "Big Cold Gold" | August 11, 2017 | 1.07 |
Shawn's million dollar Bluff claim is denied, leaving the grounds open to anyone. Kris Kelly leaps at the opportunity, dragging his family across 70 miles of frozen tundra to what he hopes will be their biggest season yet.
| 102 | 2 | "Gold War" | August 18, 2017 | 0.90 |
Shawn and Kris square off when the Kelly family invades Shawn's turf at the Bluff. Emily hits the ice with a crew of veteran miners as she attempts to reclaim her hotspot at Hasting's Creek.
| 103 | 3 | "Tunnel Vision" | August 25, 2017 | 0.89 |
Shawn gambles on a risky move. Kris suffers a life-threatening air line freeze up and makes a decision about his brother. Zeke attempts the most dangerous dive of his life through twenty feet of ice.
| 104 | 4 | "There's Company" | September 1, 2017 | 0.87 |
Shawn searches for a paystreak boulder to fund the Megadredge, but when it's flipped his season may be, too. Kris' dream of a 24-hour operation starts with a night crew, but he may wake to a nightmare. If Emily's last shot fails, she has to think bigger.
| 105 | 5 | "Cracked" | September 8, 2017 | 1.02 |
Kris' scheme to make a million on Shawn's Bluff find is sabotaged when Mr. Gold plots with a turncoat Kelly diver. Zeke may have found his mining future, but when the ice breaks up, he'll have to move to a gold spot hot enough to save the present.
| 106 | 6 | "Never Say Die" | September 15, 2017 | 1.15 |
Shawn must fix his landlocked barge, but faulty controls threaten the Megadredge dream. Brad threatens to split the family before Kris can rally back to the Bluff. With only a week's worth of dredging supplies, Emily rolls the dice, hoping for fast payoff.
| 107 | 7 | "Fight and Flight" | September 22, 2017 | 1.02 |
Shawn tries to convince potential investors that his Megadredge vision is solid. Kris' frustration frays Andy's nerves. Zeke unleashes a secret weapon, but faces an unexpected challenge. Emily tries to pull her crew together to avoid an end to her season.
| 108 | 8 | "Last Man Diving" | September 29, 2017 | 1.10 |
To fund the Megadredge, Shawn races to the Bluff with only a day left in the season. Kris is on the best gold of his life, but his shoddy equipment keeps breaking down. Zeke is desperate to salvage the season, but can't find a paystreak.

=== Season 10 (2018) ===
| No. overall | No. in season | Title | Original release date | US viewers (millions) |
|---|---|---|---|---|
| 110 | 1 | "Enter a Titan" | March 30, 2018 | 1.49 |
Newcomer Ken Kerr and the 600 ton beast Myrtle Irene threaten Shawn's plan to build his megadredge. The elements jeopardize Emily's plan to dive deeper. Kris heads to The Bluff with a new dredge, but faces complications.
| 111 | 2 | "Crash Course" | April 6, 2018 | 1.51 |
Dangers rise with the tide when Shawn has a life-threatening mishap underwater and Emily's dredge The Eroica faces a possible collision. George prospects for brother Dave and his business partner Ken Kerr while the Kellys take home a chunk of gold.
| 112 | 3 | "Wild Wild West" | April 13, 2018 | 1.39 |
The Bering Sea is now the Wild West as Shawn and Kris battle encroaching miners. Ken's beastly Myrtle Irene continues to invade and operating costs soar. Emily expands her operation but an air malfunction threatens her season.
| 113 | 4 | "Over the Line" | April 20, 2018 | 1.52 |
In the Bluff's lawless waters, Shawn and Kris wield brute strength and verbal threats to stand their ground as raging competition forces captains to change tactics. In Nome, Emily and George use brainpower, gambling on new strategies and resources.
| 114 | 5 | "Storm Surge" | April 27, 2018 | 1.36 |
The approach of a violent storm pits safety against the will to succeed. Ken rushes to free the Myrtle before it's destroyed. Kris risks being stranded. Shawn mines until the Bering Sea rips up his dredge. Emily attempts to appease nature.
| 115 | 6 | "Miners on the Storm" | May 4, 2018 | 1.12 |
A violent midsummer storm forces the fleet off the mining grounds. Shawn, Ken, Emily and Kris race to repair and improve their dredges for an end of season attack while reliving some of their most dangerous and triumphant moments on the Bering Sea.
| 116 | 7 | "Second Wind" | May 11, 2018 | 1.00 |
The Bering Sea battle heats up as Shawn bets big on a new discovery he hopes will keep him ahead of Ken's massive dredge. The Kellys are forced to find new ground. Emily nearly boils a diver alive.
| 117 | 8 | "Every Ounce Counts" | May 18, 2018 | 1.09 |
Shawn works overtime to cover for his exhausted crew. Kris is blindsided by the loss of his lead diver. Emily jumps in to prevent a fuel spill. Ken and George collaborate to find Myrtle a motherlode.
| 118 | 9 | "Closing the Gap" | May 25, 2018 | 1.08 |
Winter winds force the captains to reevaluate risk and reward. Shawn's mega-barge extraction takes a turn for the worse. Ken pushes the Myrtle to the limit on a 5-day run. Emily sends her divers deeper. Kris invents a new form of prospecting.
| 119 | 10 | "Innovate and Overcome" | June 1, 2018 | 1.07 |
In a race against winter, Shawn extends his sluice to get more gold. Ken pushes the Myrtle 24 hours a day. Emily tangles with the tide. Kris battles a bed of quartz and George enjoys a season-ending dive with his son.
| 120 | 11 | "King of Nome" | June 8, 2018 | 1.10 |
Desperate to be Nome's gold king, Shawn risks the Christine Rose in dangerous waters. Ken struggles to free the Myrtle from the harbor. Emily fights a fouled airline and Kris attempts one more dive at the Bluff.
| 121 | 12 | "Bigger and Badder" | June 15, 2018 | 1.07 |
In a shocking confrontation, Nome's top two miners Shawn and Ken come face to face after a season of squaring off, having revolutionized mining with bigger, badder, gold-grabbing machines. Secrets are revealed through never before seen footage.

=== Season 11 (2019) ===
| No. overall | No. in season | Title | Original release date | US viewers (millions) |
|---|---|---|---|---|
| 123 | 1 | "Double Down" | September 17, 2019 | 1.16 |
Despite the worst conditions in a decade, the miners hedge their bets as Shawn and Ken go head to head with their largest ships ever. Emily confronts the elements while Kris leads his family with a newfound determination.
| 124 | 2 | "Unleash the Beast" | September 24, 2019 | 0.98 |
Shawn's rival Ken unleashes his 600-ton gold gobbler while Shawn fights to keep a family dynasty. Vernon makes a valiant return in an attempt to strike it rich with a new dredge. Emily fights to reclaims her hotspot.
| 125 | 3 | "Clash of the Titans" | October 1, 2019 | 1.10 |
An epic Clash of Titans grips the gold mining fleet as Shawn constructs the largest washplant in Nome and Ken's mining monster roars to life. Vern prospects using his new innovations. Ripping currents threaten the Kellys.
| 126 | 4 | "The Sound of Money" | October 8, 2019 | 0.99 |
Vernon and his crew get stranded in the Yukon. Shawn finds a good luck charm in his son. Ken suffers a mechanical setback and Emily sends rookie diver Chase underwater.
| 127 | 5 | "Storm Ravaged" | October 15, 2019 | 0.85 |
Whipping winds and crashing waves force the miners to ask themselves how hard they're willing to fight. Shawn channels his inner MacGyver to fix a stalled machine. Kris acts boldly. Vern must make a life or death decision.
| 128 | 6 | "Guts and Gravel" | October 22, 2019 | 0.98 |
Before the winter freeze out, Shawn gambles to dig deeper than ever before as Ken brings the heat. The Kellys restart from scratch with a new dredge design. Emily aims to work nonstop.
| 129 | 7 | "Gold Blooded" | October 29, 2019 | 1.02 |
To test mother nature's stamina, Shawn pushes the Christine Rose to its maximum work depth in the face of massive swells while Ken digs on an untouched, gold-rich dirt patch. Emily faces ripping currents and an exhausted diver. Vernon hits the open seas.
| 130 | 8 | "Missing in Action" | November 5, 2019 | 0.67 |
When a fellow miner vanishes, Ken and Shawn interrupt their operations to join the search and rescue. Vern finally unleashes on the Bering Sea.
| 131 | 9 | "Battle Plan" | November 5, 2019 | 0.67 |
Shawn and Ken are neck and neck to win their $130K wager as the frigid end approaches with some dangerous winds that threaten Shawn's wash-plant installation. Emily races Mother Nature. Vern risks the Goldship while on the hunt for pay dirt.
| 132 | 10 | "Race the Storm" | November 12, 2019 | 0.89 |
With Nome in the cross-hairs of a winter storm that will shut down the harbor, Shawn and Ken battle to win their bet, but only one will be crowned The Gold King.

=== Season 12 (2020) ===
| No. overall | No. in season | Title | Original release date | US viewers (millions) |
|---|---|---|---|---|
| 136 | 1 | "Dawn of the Dredge" | May 15, 2020 | 1.23 |
Sky-high summer temperatures cause miners to search for new strategies.
| 137 | 2 | "Back in the Ring" | May 22, 2020 | 1.25 |
The Myrtle Irene gets stuck in the mud and Elaine makes up for lost time.
| 138 | 3 | "Sweet Child O' Mining" | May 29, 2020 | 1.14 |
Ken tries a new perspective to find new ground.
| 139 | 4 | "Shift Happens" | May 29, 2020 | 1.14 |
Shawn fights the shifting tide, and new diver Ben saves Vernon's day.
| 140 | 5 | "Ready, Claim, Fire" | June 5, 2020 | 1.15 |
Tensions fly as Brad leads The Reaper into hostile waters.
| 141 | 6 | "The Gold, The Bad and The Ugly" | June 5, 2020 | 1.15 |
Shawn goes for a ride, Kris raids a claim and Vernon loses his patience.
| 142 | 7 | "Dredge Men Tell No Tales" | June 12, 2020 | 1.16 |
Shawn and Ken push their operations to the brink in a massive storm.
| 143 | 8 | "Dive Hard With a Vengeance" | June 19, 2020 | 1.24 |
The Myrtle Irene's post-storm fate is revealed and Vernon mines a river.
| 144 | 9 | "Gold is Thicker Than Blood" | June 26, 2020 | 1.27 |
Shawn confronts his dad for the sake of the family operation.
| 146 | 10 | "The Heat is Off" | July 10, 2020 | 1.15 |
The dredgers scramble to finish summer strong as the season nears its end.
| 147 | 11 | "Claim of Thrones" | July 17, 2020 | 1.12 |
The approach of a season-ending storm tests the severity of Nome's gold fever. Shawn digs in deeper water. Ken pushes the Myrtle to its max. Kris blindly mines an undersea trench. Emily plays chicken with Mother Nature. Elaine proves herself to Vern.
| 148 | 12 | "How It All Pans Out" | July 24, 2020 | 1.11 |
Emily plays chicken with Mother Nature in a storm and may lose.
| 150 | 13 | "The Ice Mine Cometh" | July 31, 2020 | 1.03 |
Winter has come -- along with the unpredictable ice in decades.
| 151 | 14 | "Frozen Chokehold" | August 7, 2020 | 1.05 |
Only days into the season, a regulator freeze cuts off Shawn's air supply.
| 152 | 15 | "Snow Blind" | August 21, 2020 | 0.95 |
A violent arctic storm approaches and Shawn can't quit the gold.
| 153 | 16 | "Pain in the Ice" | August 28, 2020 | 0.95 |
Shawn goes on a marathon dive and Emily takes another shot at TOMCOD gold.
| 154 | 17 | "Total Meltdown" | September 4, 2020 | 0.91 |
Suffering possible defeat, Kris wrecks his plan and abandons his crew.
| 155 | 18 | "Cold Man and the Sea" | September 11, 2020 | 1.03 |
The clock ticks as Shawn tries to prove the viability of the TOMCOD.
| 156 | 19 | "Freezer Burn" | September 18, 2020 | 0.96 |
Shawn fights frozen ground while Kris' plan to beat the cold fizzles out.
| 157 | 20 | "Up in Flames" | September 25, 2020 | 1.03 |
Kris finds gold under the ice with fire over head and Emily risks it all.
| 158 | 21 | "No More Mr. Ice Guys" | October 2, 2020 | 1.06 |
Shawn pushes his equipment to the edge while others rise from the ashes.
| 159 | 22 | "Winter Take All" | October 9, 2020 | 1.07 |
As the miners rush to solid ground before the ice vanishes, Mr. Gold outlasts the fleet to secure TOMCOD. Kris assembles a makeshift operation. Emily rolls the dice on one last dive and Vernon hightails it to land on dangerous ice.

=== Season 13 (2021) ===
| No. overall | No. in season | Title | Original release date | US viewers (millions) |
|---|---|---|---|---|
| 160 | 1 | "Goldslingers" | April 30, 2021 | 0.98 |
With new claims up for grabs, old faces return to Nome's wild west as Mr. Gold launches his biggest season. Kris' Elim plan hits a hiccup. Vernon hustles to assemble his dream team. Emily searches for her own claim. Zeke attempts an ambitious creation.
| 161 | 2 | "A Dredge Full of Dollars" | May 7, 2021 | 1.01 |
Shawn strikes a deal with Dave Young that comes with a ticking clock. Zeke's new dredge Black Swan debuts on the Bering Sea. Kris' backup plan wildly backfires. Vernon and Emily seek out their own claims.
| 162 | 3 | "Papa's Got A Brand New Dredge" | May 14, 2021 | 1.04 |
Shawn must get the remastered Myrtle Irene onto the water. Zeke bets on himself by helping on Vernon's claim. Emily hopes to add to her all-star squad. Kris and his sceptic crew finally head to Elim.
| 163 | 4 | "Ship of Fools" | May 21, 2021 | 1.00 |
Kris and crew face one mishap after another in Elim. Shawn pursues complete control over the inland mine. Vernon pits his divers against each other in a gold-getting competition. Steve and Emily prospect on the beach.
| 164 | 5 | "Machine Gun Kellys" | May 28, 2021 | 0.93 |
The Kellys face gunfire from angry locals in Elim. Shawn injures himself on the Myrtle. Emily loses her rock-solid diver. Vernon finds a secret golden spot. The Black Swan finally gets on gold.
| 165 | 6 | "Naked and Unafraid" | June 4, 2021 | 1.07 |
Shawn pulls an all-nighter with the revamped Myrtle. The Kellys' season might be saved with a little help. Emily acts quick in a dangerous situation. Vernon hopes hiring Steve again won't be a mistake. Zeke enlists his brother to get them on gold.
| 166 | 7 | "The Claim Dating Game" | June 11, 2021 | 1.02 |
Zeke hopes to find his perfect claim match. Shawn needs the Myrtle to save the Christine Rose. Emily is down to her last shot. Vernon's luck with divers gets worse. Kris is finally on a hot streak, but will it last?
| 167 | 8 | "Dredge of Insanity" | June 18, 2021 | 1.13 |
Kris attempts to save his season with a move that may be his worst idea yet. Shawn hunts for a pay-streak to solidify his position at the top. Emily prospects a claim to call her own. Vern tries out a "crazy" new diver. Zeke sets sail on an adventure.
| 168 | 9 | "Once Upon A Mine" | June 25, 2021 | 1.06 |
"Mr Gold" Shawn Pomrenke edges closer to his goal. The Kelly's work on an excavator barge. Emily suffers breakdowns. Vern is 22 Oz from his target to pay off Claim 56. Zeke returns to Cape Rodney. Steve is annoying.
| 169 | 10 | "Last Call" | July 2, 2021 | 0.92 |
With just 24 hours left to make or break the season, an equipment malfunction jeopardizes Shawn's operation. Kris becomes the last Kelly standing. Vernon enlists Steve to prospect for winter. Zeke searches Cape Rodney. Emily finishes strong.

=== Season 14 (2021) ===
| No. overall | No. in season | Title | Original release date | US viewers (millions) |
|---|---|---|---|---|
| 171 | 1 | "Winter, Lose or Draw" | October 26, 2021 | 0.74 |
In the high-stakes game of ice mining, Shawn chases a jackpot along an ancient riverbed, Kris goes all-in on brand new equipment and Zeke bets on his season with a fresh crew.
| 172 | 2 | "Snow Man's Land" | November 2, 2021 | 0.56 |
As the fleet must dig out of a snowstorm and beware of another on the horizon, Vernon sets up on the promising Claim 56, The Kellys race to get their new equipment on the ice and Shawn battles an air compressor.
| 173 | 3 | "No Country for Cold Men" | November 9, 2021 | 0.70 |
Shawn and Vernon hope to double down with back-to-back divers. Zeke faces an undetected flooding nightmare. The Kellys run into a hose shortage that forces them to pivot.
| 174 | 4 | "Dive Till You Drop" | November 16, 2021 | 0.76 |
While all the mining teams compete in marathon dives, Shawn brings new gear to stay mining longer, Vernon sends down two ace divers, Kris expects to get on the gold and Zeke hopes for zero malfunctions.
| 175 | 5 | "Bust a Move" | November 23, 2021 | 0.71 |
While the Captains rethink their mining locations, Vernon's diver tries to mine without a light, Shawn follows a yellow brick road in search of the motherlode, the Kellys must find gold to pay off their debts and Zeke stretches out the hose.
| 176 | 6 | "Hustle and Overflow" | November 30, 2021 | 0.85 |
Shawn is driven to desperate measures to solve his water overflow problems. Zeke gives the West Beach Claim one last shot. Kris tries out Captain James as a diver. Vernon pushes forward despite dangerous ice conditions.
| 177 | 7 | "Texas Cold 'Em" | December 7, 2021 | 0.76 |
Vernon races against weakening ice on Claim 56. Kris preps his operation for his upcoming absence. Shawn turns to an unusual method to track down a tricky paystreak. Zeke makes an eleventh hour move to Tomcod.
| 178 | 8 | "Yo Brother, Where Art Thou?" | December 14, 2021 | 0.80 |
With Kris away on father duty, Andy must bring in the gold as captain of the Reaper. Vernon tries to maximize his returns by minimizing his moves. Shawn finds himself just short of a paystreak. Zeke tries Shawn's coordinates to put some gold in the box.
| 179 | 9 | "Mining on a Prayer" | December 21, 2021 | 0.79 |
Kris must move fast in the face of a life-threatening incident.
| 180 | 10 | "Legend vs. Underdog" | December 28, 2021 | 0.91 |
Top contenders Shawn and Vernon battle it out for their final haul in the face of a storm ready to knock them off the ice. Zeke risks one last move. Kris hopes to pull enough to set up his summer.

=== Season 15 (2022–2023) ===
| No. overall | No. in season | Title | Original release date | US viewers (millions) |
|---|---|---|---|---|
| 181 | 1 | "The Empires Strike Back" | December 6, 2022 | 0.56 |
Mining empires expand and clash in an epic battle to dominate Nome. Mr. Gold has a plan to yield 3000 ounces. The Kellys impress a new investor. Vernon builds a kingdom on Claim 56. Zeke has a deal to work Tomcod. Emily makes a surprise announcement.
| 183 | 2 | "This Means War" | December 13, 2022 | 0.62 |
Two monster dredges duke it out on the Bering Sea as a war brews between Shawn and Kris. Vernon's diver bleeds on his ascent. Emily deals with mechanical difficulties. A notorious nomad returns to team with Zeke.
| 185 | 3 | "Winds of Misfortune" | December 20, 2022 | 0.68 |
A series of questionable calls by Kris brings the Mistress to her breaking point. Mr. Gold takes a huge gamble by mining Cooper Gulch. Vernon acts on a hot prospecting tip. Emily's crew takes risky dives. Zeke's new girl is his gold luck charm on Tomcod.
| 186 | 4 | "No Jane, No Gain" | December 27, 2022 | 0.65 |
A brand-new arrival shakes up the gold game as Emily shows Jane Kilcher the ropes of running a dredge. Kris Kelly deals with an excavator malfunction. Hurricane Dave is horrified by Vernon's methods. Digging deep pays off for Mr. Gold.
| 187 | 5 | "Brawl of Duty" | January 3, 2023 | 0.68 |
As tempers flare, the conflict between Shawn and the Kellys becomes physical. Mechanical difficulties plague the Mistress. Vernon is thrilled to have his A-Team back in action. Jane celebrates a gold-laden birthday and Emily drops a bombshell.
| 188 | 6 | "Truce or Consequences" | January 10, 2023 | 0.73 |
Shawn and Kris attempt to settle their feud once and for all. Vernon tussles with an annoying moocher. Jane Kilcher faces a huge challenge out on Claim 14. In the hopes of jump-starting his gold season, Zeke embarks on a marathon suction dredging campaign.
| 189 | 7 | "Diver's Ed" | January 17, 2023 | 0.66 |
The Gold Ship's crew strikes out on their own while Vernon is away. Shawn faces an unexpected malfunction on the Myrtle just as boss Dave Young comes to inspect it. Zeke and Emily hope that new divers will bring huge paystreaks. Kris returns to the Reaper while the Mistress is out of commission.
| 190 | 8 | "The Miner's Code" | January 24, 2023 | 0.73 |
Shawn and Vernon embark on a harrowing rescue mission on a stormy Bering Sea. Mistress problems force Kris into limp mode. Zeke relaunches the Havilah with a wild crew.
| 191 | 9 | "There Will Be Blood" | January 31, 2023 | 0.70 |
A shocking injury jeopardizes Kris Kelly’s gold goal for the season. Mr. Gold gambles on northern winds and low tides to provide a huge paystreak. Zeke cleans up on the Havilah. Emily and Vernon rally their crews to end the gold summer strong.
| 192 | 10 | "Last Miner Standing" | February 7, 2023 | 0.60 |
A key crew member abandons Kris as he tries to hold onto the Mistress and stay out the longest. Shawn fights to retain his crown as the Gold King of Nome. Zeke and crew have a bro-down on the Havilah. Emily and Vernon's crews vie for a strong, lucrative finish to the season.

=== Season 16 (2023) ===
| No. overall | No. in season | Title | Original release date | US viewers (millions) |
|---|---|---|---|---|
| 193 | 1 | "Goldfellas" | August 1, 2023 | N/A |
Young mining gangster Chris McCully challenges Mr. Gold's dominance. Wise guys Kris and Andy prospect. Don Vernon faces health issues. Made man Zeke creates a palace on the ice. A pregnant Emily leaves Jane in charge of the operation.
| 194 | 2 | "Evolve or Die" | August 8, 2023 | 0.60 |
Innovative mining strategies pay off for Chris and Shawn. A crew screwup leaves Kris once again behind in the gold count. A shocking discovery reveals why Emily's crew hasn’t been seeing any gold in the box.
| 195 | 3 | "New Kid on the Ice Block" | August 15, 2023 | 0.62 |
Chris McCully continues to pose a serious threat to Mr. Gold. Vernon and crew are plagued by mishaps. The Kellys wait for a game-changing piece of gold mining equipment to arrive. Shawn competes in Nome's biggest snowmobile race.
| 196 | 4 | "Ice Mission: Impossible" | August 22, 2023 | 0.65 |
Shawn and Zeke each risk dangerous ice missions in the hopes of big paystreaks. Kris' gold mining miracle has arrived but requires some assembly. Jane does her best with an absent Emily and a diver who can't swim.
| 197 | 5 | "A Nightmare on Nome Street" | August 29, 2023 | 0.66 |
Chris finds himself stranded on the ice. Shawn hits a mysterious dry spell. The Kellys' brand-new Crawler awakens but encounters electrical problems. A tangled tether spells bad news for Zeke and the boys. Vernon finds two divers are better than one.
| 198 | 6 | "Crawl to Redemption" | September 5, 2023 | N/A |
The Kellys unveil their secret gold mining weapon. Chris McCully's hot paystreak continues. A scary close call forces Zeke to adjust strategy. Jane butts heads with her crew as tensions boil over. Shawn discovers a hidden treasure at the bottom of the Bering Sea.
| 199 | 7 | "The Wolf of Wall Streak" | September 12, 2023 | 0.55 |
Chris McCully and crew hit a paystreak so lucrative they call it "Wall Street." Shawn strikes gold all the way at 40 feet under the ice. Kris and Andy argue over their new underwater gold-getting toy. Vernon's diver faces a possible disaster.
| 200 | 8 | "Jane's Affliction" | September 19, 2023 | N/A |
Jane clashes with Emily's crew over being disrespected. Equipment failures cause delays for Chris and Shawn. Kris is thrilled to find his Crawler in action. Pressure ridges cause one close call too many for Zeke and his crew.
| 201 | 9 | "Big Dig Energy" | September 26, 2023 | N/A |
The Kellys quarrel while trying to make their gold-sucking Crawler work. Some anatomical-looking worms in the sea may lead Shawn to gold. Vernon's best laid plans falter as he deals with health issues. Jane receives news of the birth of Emily's baby.
| 202 | 10 | "The Last Duel" | October 3, 2023 | N/A |
Mr. Gold and Chris McCully battle it out for the top spot on the gold board. The Kellys are at risk of ending the season with no gold. After some dangerous dives, Jane, Vernon and Zeke's crews each make a push to finish the season with a bang.

=== Season 17 (2023) ===
| No. overall | No. in season | Title | Original release date | U.S. viewers (millions) |
|---|---|---|---|---|
| 203 | 1 | "Captains of Industry" | October 6, 2023 | N/A |
| 204 | 2 | "New Recruits" | October 13, 2023 | N/A |
| 205 | 3 | "Gone With the Wind" | October 20, 2023 | N/A |
| 206 | 4 | "Sea-ing Red" | October 27, 2023 | N/A |
| 207 | 5 | "Born a Gamblin' Man" | November 3, 2023 | N/A |
| 208 | 6 | "Drawing Bloodlines" | November 10, 2023 | N/A |
| 209 | 7 | "Out of Their Depths" | November 17, 2023 | N/A |
| 209 | 8 | "No Sleep Till Landfall" | November 24, 2023 | N/A |
| 209 | 9 | "Apocalypse Nome" | December 1, 2023 | N/A |
| 210 | 10 | "A Murky Future" | December 8, 2023 | N/A |
| 211 | 11 | "Fortune's Fools" | December 15, 2023 | N/A |
| 212 | 12 | "Endgame" | December 22, 2023 | N/A |

=== Season 18 (2024) ===
| No. overall | No. in season | Title | Original release date | U.S. viewers (millions) |
|---|---|---|---|---|
| 213 | 1 | "Into Hell Niño" | August 16, 2024 | 0.64 |
| 214 | 2 | "Opportunity Knocks" | August 23, 2024 | 0.73 |
| 215 | 3 | "The Art of Cold War" | August 30, 2024 | 0.58 |
| 216 | 4 | "Nome Alone" | September 6, 2024 | 0.59 |
| 217 | 5 | "A Tale of Three Miners" | September 13, 2024 | 0.61 |
| 218 | 6 | "Place Your Bets" | September 13, 2024 | 0.45 |
| 219 | 7 | "Perfect Disharmony" | September 20, 2024 | 0.63 |
| 220 | 8 | "Tangled Up in Gold" | September 20, 2024 | 0.43 |
| 221 | 9 | "Choose Your Own Misadventure" | September 27, 2024 | 0.59 |
| 222 | 10 | "The Pit and the Pugilists" | October 4, 2024 | 0.61 |
| 223 | 11 | "Trapped Under Ice" | October 11, 2024 | 0.66 |
| 224 | 12 | "Downside Up" | October 18, 2024 | 0.51 |

=== Season 19 (2025) ===
| No. overall | No. in season | Title | Original release date | U.S. viewers (millions) |
|---|---|---|---|---|
| 225 | 1 | "Going Deep" | August 8, 2025 | N/A |
| 226 | 2 | "Storm Warning" | August 15, 2025 | N/A |
| 227 | 3 | "High Stakes Hustle" | August 22, 2025 | N/A |
| 228 | 4 | "Stand Your Ground" | August 29, 2025 | N/A |
| 229 | 5 | "Boiling Point" | September 5, 2025 | N/A |
| 230 | 6 | "Big Bering Sea Gold Nugget" | September 12, 2025 | N/A |
| 231 | 7 | "Pedal to the Gold Medal" | September 19, 2025 | N/A |
| 232 | 8 | "Make or Break" | September 26, 2025 | N/A |
| 233 | 9 | "Gold Can Mend a Broken Heart" | October 3, 2025 | N/A |
| 234 | 10 | "Last Gasp for Gold" | October 10, 2025 | N/A |

=== Specials ===
| No. overall | No. in season | Title | Original release date | US viewers (millions) |
|---|---|---|---|---|
| 9 | — | "After The Dredge - Risks and Relations" | March 23, 2012 | 1.49 |
The Bering Sea Gold crews gather and sound off about life in Nome during and after the show. Wild Ranger's Scott M. and Vern's reunion is explosive. Emily and Zeke answer about the exact nature of their relationship. Meet the mysterious white-bearded dredger.
| 10 | — | "After The Dredge - Gains and Losses" | March 30, 2012 | 1.04 |
The Bering Sea Gold crews gather and sound off about gold gained and relationships strained. Christine Rose's Shawn talks about his being stabbed. The Clark's Zeke drops a bombshell on the Sluicey crew. Wild Ranger's Scott M. responds to Vern's accusations.
| 29 | — | "Getting to the Bottom" | April 5, 2013 | 1.35 |
Behind the scenes for the entire season, pre-season setup and post-season wrap-up and pack-up.
| 98 | — | "Luck of the Irish" | April 12, 2017 | 0.92 |
The Kellys reminisce about their five years mining for gold in Nome, Alaska. They examine their dysfunctional family dynamic and the incessant squabbling that is a constant threat to their solidarity.
| 99 | — | "Gold Fever" | April 19, 2017 | 0.84 |
Miners describe what it's like to succumb to the lure of the hunt for gold, delving into the impact the quest has on their lives and moods.
| 109 | — | "Gold Nuggets" | September 29, 2017 | 0.87 |
Previously unaired footage from the winter mining season is shown for the first time. Zeke bickers with his brother over their failure to find gold and Emily shows her resourcefulness after a major piece of equipment malfunctions. Meanwhile, the Kellys get lost on their way to the Bluff and Shawn hatches an idea that will solve two big problems with one transaction.
| 122 | — | "Ready, Set, Gold" | September 17, 2019 | 0.91 |
As Nome bustles with gold miners, Vern returns with a grand mission. Shawn works on his mega-dredge. Ken reinforces with over $500K in upgrades. Emily and the Kellys look to improve on their best seasons yet.
| 133 | — | "Friend or Foe" | December 11, 2019 | 0.79 |
Gearing up for the final push, Shawn patches up the Christine Rose.
| 134 | — | "Pay the Piper" | December 11, 2019 | 0.50 |
Mining the Bering Sea's golden depths takes nearly super-human mental and physical stamina. With exclusive content, the miners provide new insight on the season and Nome's two titans come face to face to settle the score on the richest season ever.
| 135 | — | "Gold Dogs, New Tricks" | May 8, 2020 | 0.77 |
Kris receives a once in a lifetime deal. Vernon upgrades the Gold Ship.
| 145 | — | "The Kellys' Fireworks Extravaganza" | July 3, 2020 | 0.76 |
The Kellys travel back to Northern California for an explosive adventure.
| 149 | — | "Breaking the Ice" | July 24, 2020 | 0.58 |
With added scenes and facts – the miners prepare their operations for the harsh winter looming on the horizon. After surviving a tumultuous summer season, they now brace themselves for frigid temperatures and a sea that becomes an endless sheet of ice.
| 170 | — | "The Nome-inees Are..." | July 9, 2021 | 0.60 |
In this 10th Anniversary BSG Awards Show, the fleet competes in various categories for the coveted "Nomie" Award as we commemorate a decade of gold mining on the Bering Sea. Remember, there are no losers -- except those who don't win.
| 182 | — | "Bad Blood" | December 6, 2022 | 0.41 |
The long-running feud between Shawn Pomrenke and Kris Kelly illuminates the Kellys' questionable track record and the events that pushed the rival miners to the brink of war.
| 184 | — | "Golden Girls" | December 13, 2022 | 0.42 |
The parallel journeys of Emily Riedel and Alaska: The Last Frontier's Jane Kilcher highlight their challenges and triumphs in different Alaskan locales as Emily prepares to bring Jane aboard The Eroica to take charge while Emily's gone.
