= Myrtle Irene =

Excavator dredge mining vessel

The Myrtle Irene (USCG id: 643114) is a crewed flat-topped power barge adapted into a littorals at-sea excavator dredge mining vessel designed by Tony Messina out of Northern Wisconsin. It is owned by Arctic Sea Mining, LLC and its registered home port is Nome, Alaska, USA. This excavator dredge mining barge is introduced and featured since the 2018 season 10 in Bering Sea Gold, a Discovery Channel USA reality TV show on sea mining for gold in Alaska. The excavator dredge cost $6,000,000 to build.

== Specifications ==
Vessel 1495

- Launch date: 1981
- Length: 120 ft (37 m); 130 ft (40 m) with extension.
- Width: 45 ft (14 m)
- Depth: 7 ft (2.1 m)
- Net tonnage: 317 short tons (288 tonnes)
- Gross tonnage: 600 short tons (540 tonnes)
- Mining rate: 300 cu ft (8.5 m^{3}) per hour
- Mining depth: 30 ft (9.1 m)

== See also ==
- Tuvli 160
- Christine Rose (dredge)
- AU Grabber
- Viking Dredge 1
- Viking Dredge 2
- Bima (dredge)
