= Bering Sea Gold =

Television series

- Narrated by: Thom Beers (seasons 1–2); Mike Rowe (seasons 3–12); Hugo Speer (Gold Divers)
- Opening theme: Gold In These Hills by Brandon Michael Kinder
- Country of origin: United States
- Original language: English
- No. of seasons: 19
- No. of episodes: 234 (list of episodes)

Production
- Executive producer: Thom Beers
- Producers: Jeff Meredith; Dave Freed
- Editors: Isaiah Camp; Joe Hahle
- Running time: approx. 45 minutes
- Production company: Original Productions

Original release
- Network: Discovery Channel
- Release: January 27, 2012 – present

Related
- Gold Rush; Prospectors; Jungle Gold; Ice Cold Gold; Flying Wild Alaska; Yukon Gold

Bering Sea Gold (also known as Gold Divers in the UK) is an American reality television series, set in Nome, Alaska, on Norton Sound, that airs on Discovery Channel. It is from the creators of the Deadliest Catch reality TV show.

The show is divided into the summer dredging season (aired in the spring), under the title Bering Sea Gold, and the spring dredging season (aired in the fall), under the title Bering Sea Gold: Under The Ice. For the first three seasons, this distinction held; in the 2015 4th season of the spring ice dredging season, the title card changed to "Bering Sea Gold", making the title identical to the original summer dredging season show. This continued with the 2016 5th seasons.

The show follows boats equipped with various setups to achieve gold mining in a summertime, cold northern latitude, shallow water, ocean environment. The fleet each typically consists of a sluicing apparatus, a means of paydirt collection (dredge), and a cold-water-diving life support system. Conflict issues include choppy seas, poor underwater visibility, inconsistent fuel delivery, personnel issues, mining location rights, sufficient paydirt discovery, diver safety, and ocean-damaged equipment failures. Each season of episodes follow the current fleet of dredges.

The "ice" series follows dredges housed in temporary shelters set up over ice holes. Several crew members have appeared in both the summer dredging and spring ice dredging seasons.

== History ==
In 2012, one of the featured divers on the show, John Bunce, committed suicide during the course of filming the season. The incident aired in 2013.

On March 11, 2020, it was announced that the fourteenth season will premiere on April 1, 2020.

The Martinson mining family, shown as background characters on Bering Sea Gold, was featured in Gold Rush: Freddy Dodge's Mine Rescue.

== Cast ==
=== Season 1 ===
Name	Dredge	Details
Steve Pomrenke	Christine Rose	Co-Owner of the Christine Rose and father of Shawn Pomrenke.
Shawn Pomrenke	Christine Rose	Co-Owner and Captain of the Christine Rose, son of Steve Pomrenke.
Cody Moen	Christine Rose	Deckhand on the Christine Rose.
Robbi Wade	Christine Rose	Deckhand on the Christine Rose.
Ian Foster	Sluicey	Owner and Captain of the Sluicey.
Scott Foster	Sluicey	Diver on the Sluicey.
Ezekial 'Zeke' Tenhoff	The Clark	Owner and Captain of The Clark, who built the dredge from scratch in 2008.
Emily Riedel	The Clark	Deckhand on The Clark. Daughter of Steve Riedel and childhood friend of Zeke Tenhoff.
Vernon Adkison	Wild Ranger	Owner of the Wild Ranger.
Scott Meisterheim	Wild Ranger	Captain of the Wild Ranger.
Jason Walker	Wild Ranger	Diver on the Wild Ranger.
Steve Riedel	Wild Ranger	Diver on the Wild Ranger. Father of Emily Riedel.

=== Season 1 ICE ===
Dredge	Name	Details
Lazy Gator	Joe Fullwood	Owner / Captain.
Lazy Gator	Derek McLarty	Diver.
Lazy Gator	Jacob Musich	Diver.
Lazy Gator	Jesse Strickling	Diver.
Lazy Gator	Ricky Larsen	Diver / Mechanic.
Shamrock	Steve Pomrenke	Co-Owner / Shawn Pomrenke's father.
Shamrock	Shawn Pomrenke	Co-Owner / Captain / Steve Pomrenke's son.
Shamrock	Cody Moen	Diver.
Shamrock	Phil Rode	Diver.
Shamrock	Jason Higa	Diver.
Shamrock	Vince Skiba	Diver.
The Clark	Ezekial 'Zeke' Tenhoff	Owner / Captain / Best friend of John Bunce.
The Clark	Emily Riedel	Deckhand / Steve Riedel's daughter / Zeke Tenhoff's childhood friend.
The Clark	Steve Riedel	Diver / Emily Riedel's father.
The Clark	John Bunce	Diver / Best friend of Zeke Tenhoff.
The Clark	Grant Wilkins	Diver / Mechanic.

=== Season 2 ===
Name	Dredge	Details
Steve Pomrenke	Christine Rose	Co-Owner of the Christine Rose and father of Shawn Pomrenke.
Shawn Pomrenke	Christine Rose	Co-Owner and Captain of the Christine Rose, son of Steve Pomrenke.
Cody Moen	Christine Rose	Deckhand on the Christine Rose.
Doug Graham	Christine Rose	Deckhand on the Christine Rose.
Vernon Adkison	Wild Ranger	Captain of the Wild Ranger, Owner of the Wild Ranger, the Bering Booty and four other, unnamed dredges.
Daryl Galipeau	Wild Ranger	Diver on the Wild Ranger.
Steve Riedel	Wild Ranger / The Clark	Diver on the Wild Ranger and The Clark; fired from the Wild Ranger, moved to The Clark.
Dave Thompson	Wild Ranger	Diver on the Wild Ranger, an experienced oil diver and only lasted just one day on the Wild Ranger, (when he was called-in after Steve Riedel failed to turn-up for work one day), because he couldn't work in the sea, as he didn't feel safe with all the technical problems on board the dredge.
Elaine Adkison	Bering Booty / Wild Ranger	Captain of the Bering Booty and Deckhand on the Wild Ranger. Daughter of Vernon Adkison. Girlfriend of Flint Collins. Brought over to her father's dredge with her boyfriend after Steve Riedel was sacked.
Flint Collins	Bering Booty / Wild Ranger	Diver on the Bering Booty and Wild Ranger. Boyfriend of Elaine Adkison. Brought over to Elaine's father's dredge with her after Steve Riedel was sacked.
Zeke Tenhoff	The Clark / The Edge	Owner of The Clark, Captain of The Edge, Older brother of Gabe Tenhoff and Best friend of John Bunce.
Emily Riedel	The Edge	Deckhand on The Edge.
John Bunce	The Edge	Diver on The Edge, Best friend of Zeke Tenhoff, 2012 Gold Panning Champion of Nome and committed suicide during the TV season, by gunshot to the head from a .44 Magnum via two-pulls of Russian Roulette (1985–2012, age 27).
Gabriel 'Gabe' Tenhoff	The Edge	Diver on The Edge, Younger brother of Zeke Tenhoff, Brought on to the dredge as a diver, after John Bunce's sudden death by suicide.
Scott Meisterheim	Anchor Management	Captain of Anchor Management, Best friend of Todd Allen.
Todd Allen	Anchor Management	Diver on Anchor Management, Best friend of Scott Meisterheim. Left midway through the season after Scott Meisterheim's drinking binge, forced the captain to check himself into rehab.
Dan Fogel	Anchor Management	Diver on Anchor Management. Left midway through the season after Scott Meisterheim's drinking binge, forced the captain to check himself into rehab.
Dan Larsen	Anchor Management	Diver on Anchor Management. Left midway through the season after Scott Meisterheim's drinking binge, forced the captain to check himself into rehab.
Joe Dehring	Anchor Management	Diver on Anchor Management. Brought on before the end of the season after Scott Meisterheim's drinking binge, made his old crew abandon the dredge, so consequently he had to find a new diver.
Grant Wilkins	The Clark	Captain of The Clark.

=== Season 2 ICE ===
Dredge	Name	Details
The Clark	Zeke Tenhoff	Owner / Captain.
The Clark	Glen LeBaron	Diver / The Dragon inventor.
The Clark	Ian Foster	Diver.
The Clark	Rob Hehnlin	Co-Owner of The Edge / Diver / Engineer.
The Clark	Milan Schield	Diver.
Shamrock	Steve Pomrenke	Co-Owner / Shawn Pomrenke's father.
Shamrock	Shawn Pomrenke	Co-Owner / Captain / Steve Pomrenke's son.
Shamrock	Cody Moen	Diver.
Shamrock	Phil Rode	Diver.
Shamrock	Jason Higa	Diver.
Shamrock	Jesse Virnig	Diver.
Wild Ranger	Vernon Adkison	Owner / Captain.
Wild Ranger	Daryl Galipeau	Diver.
Wild Ranger	Kevin Jupina	Diver.
Wild Ranger	Gordon Grebe	Deckhand / Engineer.
Anchor Management	Scott Meisterheim	Captain.
Anchor Management	Joe Dehring	Diver.
Anchor Management	Alan Balodis	Diver.
Anchor Management	Geordie Krapf	Diver.
Steve's World on Ice	Steve Riedel	Captain.
Steve's World on Ice	Emily Riedel	Deckhand / Steve Riedel's daughter / Zeke Tenhoff's childhood friend.
Steve's World on Ice	Brad Kelly	Diver.
Steve's World on Ice	Travis Richardson	Diver.
Steve's World on Ice	Grant Wilkins	Diver / Mechanic.

=== Season 3 ===
Name	Dredge	Details
Steve Pomrenke	Christine Rose	Co-Owner of the Christine Rose and father of Shawn Pomrenke.
Shawn Pomrenke	Christine Rose	Co-Owner and Captain of the Christine Rose, son of Steve Pomrenke.
Cody Moen	Christine Rose	Deckhand on the Christine Rose.
Jesse Virnig	Christine Rose	Deckhand on the Christine Rose.
Hank Schimschat	AU Grabber	Owner and Captain of the AU Grabber.
Scott Meisterheim	AU Grabber	Deckhand on the AU Grabber, fired midway through the season after repeated failure to turn-up for work and not following the captain's orders.
Nathan Makowski	AU Grabber	Deckhand on the AU Grabber.
Angie Decker	AU Grabber	Deckhand on the AU Grabber.
John Parks	AU Grabber	Deckhand on the AU Grabber, the other excavator operative on the dredge and a very experienced one at that, taking over shifts from Hank Schimschat when he's not working.
Jason Higa	AU Grabber	Deckhand on the AU Grabber, brought on midway through the season after Scott Meisterheim's sacking.
Emily Riedel	The Eroica	Captain of The Eroica (formerly The Edge) and daughter of Steve Riedel.
Derek McLarty	The Eroica	Diver on The Eroica and left midway through the season after the captain failed to turn-up for work over two consecutive weeks.
Spencer McCleskey	The Eroica	Diver on The Eroica and left midway through the season after the captain failed to turn-up for work over two consecutive weeks.
Shem Fogelman	The Eroica	Diver on The Eroica and left midway through the season after the captain failed to turn-up for work over two consecutive weeks.
Vernon Adkison	Wild Ranger	Captain of the Wild Ranger, owner of six dredges.
Kevin Jupina	Wild Ranger / The Eroica	Diver on the Wild Ranger and The Eroica. Left the Wild Ranger midway through the season, then moved to The Eroica.
Daryl Valle	Wild Ranger / The Eroica	Diver on the Wild Ranger and The Eroica. Left the Wild Ranger midway through the season, then moved to The Eroica.
Tony Mann	Wild Ranger / The Eroica	Diver on the Wild Ranger and The Eroica. Left the Wild Ranger midway through the season, then moved to The Eroica.
Glen LeBaron	Dragon / Miss Nomer / Minnow	Inventor of the sub-surface dredge the Dragon, Owner and Captain of the Miss Nomer. Diver on the Minnow. Boyfriend of Jasmin George.
Jasmin George	Miss Nomer / Minnow	Deckhand on the Miss Nomer and Minnow. Girlfriend of Glen LeBaron.
Zeke Tenhoff	The Clark / Miss Nomer	Owner and Captain of The Clark, Diver on the Miss Nomer.
Steve Riedel	Minnow	Captain of the Minnow and father of Emily Riedel.
Brad Kelly	Minnow / Reaper	Diver on the Minnow, Captain of the Reaper (formerly the Minnow). Father to Kris and Andy Kelly.
Kris Kelly	Minnow / Reaper	Diver on the Minnow and the Reaper, Oldest son of Brad Kelly and brother to Andy Kelly.
Andy Kelly	Minnow / Reaper	Diver on the Minnow and the Reaper, Youngest son of Brad Kelly and brother to Kris Kelly.

=== Season 3 ICE ===
Dredge	Name	Details
Wild Ranger	Vernon Adkison	Owner.
Wild Ranger	Jason Walker	Captain / Fired by Vernon Adkison after falling out with the whole crew, due to his anger management issues and not following the owner's orders.
Wild Ranger	Justin Cooke	Captain / Hired by Vernon Adkison after Jason Walker's sacking and due to his previous experience as an oil diver.
Wild Ranger	Spencer McCleskey	Diver.
Wild Ranger	Shem Fogelman	Diver.
Wild Ranger	Flint Collins	Diver / Elaine Adkison's boyfriend.
Wild Ranger	Elaine Adkison	Deckhand / Flint Collins' girlfriend.
Shamrock	Steve Pomrenke	Co-Owner / Shawn Pomrenke's father.
Shamrock	Shawn Pomrenke	Co-Owner / Captain / Steve Pomrenke's son.
Shamrock	Cody Moen	Diver.
Shamrock	Phil Rode	Diver.
Shamrock	Jesse Virnig	Diver.
Shamrock	Jacob Musich	Diver.
Miss Nomer	Glen LeBaron	Owner / Captain / Jasmin George's boyfriend.
Miss Nomer	Zeke Tenhoff	Diver / Sarah Dunn's boyfriend / After Zeke and Glen mutually agree to end their partnership, Zeke sets up his own operation with Sarah in the form of his old dredge The Clark again, after being paid-off his earnings in gold, for his diving time, with Glen.
Miss Nomer	Jasmin George	Deckhand / Glen LeBaron's girlfriend.
Miss Nomer	Sarah Dunn	Deckhand / Zeke Tenhoff's girlfriend / After Zeke and Glen mutually agree to end their partnership, Zeke sets up his own operation with Sarah in the form of his old dredge The Clark again, after being paid-off her earnings in gold, for her time as a deckhand for Zeke, with Glen.
The Reaper	Brad Kelly	Captain / Mechanic / Kris and Andy Kelly's father.
The Reaper	Kris Kelly	Diver / Brad Kelly's son / Andy Kelly's older brother.
The Reaper	Andy Kelly	Diver / Brad Kelly's son / Kris Kelly's younger brother.
The Reaper	Katy Priester	Diver / Dived once and after a bad experience, never did so again.
The Clark	Zeke Tenhoff	Owner / Captain / Sarah Dunn's boyfriend / After Zeke and Glen mutually agree to end their partnership, Zeke sets up his own operation with Sarah in the form of his old dredge The Clark again, after being paid-off his earnings in gold, for his diving time, with Glen.
The Clark	Sarah Dunn	Deckhand / Zeke Tenhoff's girlfriend / After Zeke and Glen mutually agree to end their partnership, Zeke sets up his own operation with Sarah in the form of his old dredge The Clark again, after being paid-off her earnings in gold, for her time as a deckhand for Zeke, with Glen.
The Eroica	Emily Riedel	Owner / Captain / The Dragon Slayer inventor.
The Eroica	Daryl Valle	Diver.
The Eroica	Tony Mann	Diver.

=== Season 4 ===
Name	Dredge	Details
Shawn Pomrenke	Christine Rose	Co-Owner and Captain of the Christine Rose.
Cody Moen	Christine Rose	Deckhand on the Christine Rose.
Jesse Virnig	Christine Rose	Deckhand on the Christine Rose.
Jacob Musich	Christine Rose	Deckhand on the Christine Rose.
Hank Schimschat	AU Grabber	Owner and Captain of the AU Grabber.
Nathan Makowski	AU Grabber	Deckhand on the AU Grabber.
John Parks	AU Grabber	Deckhand on the AU Grabber, the other excavator operative on the dredge and a very experienced one at that, taking over shifts from Hank Schimschat when he's not working.
Jason Higa	AU Grabber	Deckhand on the AU Grabber.
Vernon Adkison	Wild Ranger	Owner of the Wild Ranger.
Justin Cooke	Wild Ranger	Captain of the Wild Ranger.
Spencer McCleskey	Wild Ranger	Diver on the Wild Ranger. Left the dredge midway through the season to honour his close friendship with Shem and Elaine.
Shem Fogelman	Wild Ranger	Diver on the Wild Ranger. Elaine Adkison's boyfriend. Left the dredge midway through the season with Elaine after she had an argument with her father over her role on the dredge.
Flint Collins	Wild Ranger	Diver on the 'Wild Ranger, Left the dredge at the start of the season after splitting up with his now ex-girlfriend Elaine Adkison.
Bobby Lowe	Wild Ranger	Diver on the 'Wild Ranger, Brought on to the dredge at the start of the season to replace one of Vernon's divers who had left.
Kelsy Lessing	Wild Ranger	Diver on the 'Wild Ranger, Brought on to the dredge at midway through the season to replace one of Vernon's divers who had left.
Lucas Wolf	Wild Ranger	Diver on the 'Wild Ranger, Brought on to the dredge at midway through the season to replace one of Vernon's divers who had left.
Elaine Adkison	Wild Ranger	Deckhand on the Wild Ranger, Shem Fogelman's girlfriend and oldest daughter of Vernon Adkison. Left the dredge midway through the season with Shem after an argument with her father over her role on the dredge. Came back at the end of the season and agreed to work for her father on the dredge next season after apologising to him and announcing she was pregnant expecting her first child with Shem.
Yvonne Adkison	Wild Ranger	Deckhand on the Wild Ranger and youngest daughter of Vernon Adkison.
Emily Riedel	The Eroica	Owner and Captain of The Eroica.
Kevin Jupina	The Eroica	Diver on The Eroica. Left the dredge midway through the season after an argument with Emily Riedel.
Jonathan Ruppe	The Eroica	Diver on The Eroica. Left the dredge midway through the season after realising he was too broke to carry on living in Nome.
Daryl Galipeau	The Eroica	Diver on The Eroica. Brought on to the dredge midway through the season after Emily Riedel was left with no crew after both of her divers left.
Zeke Tenhoff	The Clark	Owner and Captain of The Clark, Sarah Dunn's boyfriend.
Sarah Dunn	The Clark	Deckhand on The Clark and Zeke Tenhoff's girlfriend.
Brad Kelly	Reaper	Captain of the Reaper. Father to Kris and Andy Kelly.
Kris Kelly	Reaper / Loko	Diver on the Reaper, Co-Owner of Loko, oldest son of Brad Kelly and brother to Andy Kelly.
Andy Kelly	Reaper	Diver on the Reaper, youngest son of Brad Kelly and brother to Kris Kelly.
Dave Magliocca Aka “Boston Dave” and “Another Failed Miner”	Loko	Co-Owner of Loko.

=== Season 4 ICE ===
Dredge	Name	Details
Wild Ranger	Vernon Adkison	Owner.
Wild Ranger	Derek McLarty	Captain / Diver / Mechanic/ The Golden Seahorse invented by Eddy Pump Corporation.
Wild Ranger	Bobby Lowe	Deckhand.
Wild Ranger	Kelsy Lessing	Deckhand.
Wild Ranger	Lucas Wolf	Deckhand.
Shamrock	Shawn Pomrenke	Co-Owner / Captain / Mechanic.
Shamrock	Cody Moen	Diver.
Shamrock	Phil Rode	Diver.
Shamrock	Jesse Virnig	Diver.
Shamrock	Jacob Musich	Diver.
The Clark	Zeke Tenhoff	Co-Owner / Captain/ Mechanic.
The Clark	Emily Riedel	Co-Owner / Deckhand.
The Clark	Shelby Johnson	Diver.
The Clark	Jen Newby	Diver.
The Clark	Kendall Winslow	Diver / Quit at the start of the season after concerns for her own safety when diving.
Paddy Wagon	Kris Kelly	Co-Owner / Captain / Mechanic / Brad Kelly's son / Andy Kelly's older brother.
Paddy Wagon	Andy Kelly	Co-Owner / Diver / Brad Kelly's son / Kris Kelly's younger brother.
The Reaper	Brad Kelly	Owner / Captain/ Mechanic / Kris and Andy Kelly's father.
The Reaper	Dave Nelson	Diver / Fired after raising safety concerns over the dredge to an un-impressed Brad Kelly.
The Reaper	Byron Coe	Diver / Fired after he showed his diving inexperience to Brad Kelly.

== Dredges ==
Dredge	Type	Seasons	Details
Christine Rose	Bucket dredge	1-	Both owned and built by the Pomrenkes, until Season 3, the largest dredge in Nome.
Sluicey	Suction dredge	1	Both owned and built by Ian Foster, a simple set of floats with suction dredge equipment.
The Clark	Suction dredge	1–2, 4-	Both owned and built by Zeke Tenhoff, a basic average suction dredge.
Wild Ranger	Suction dredge	1-	Owned by Vernon Atkinson, a simple set of floats with suction dredge equipment.
The Edge (for Season 2); The Eroica (from Season 3 onwards)	Suction dredge	2-	Both owned and built by Andrew Lee and Rob Hehnlin, captained by Zeke Tenhoff as "The Edge" in Season 2, bought by Emily Riedel in season 3 and renamed "The Eroica", a simple set of floats with suction dredge equipment.
Anchor Management	Suction dredge	2	Both captained and built by Scott Meisterheim, a sub par suction dredge (currently sitting at the bottom of the Bering Sea incurring fines).
Bering Booty	Suction dredge	2	Owned by Vernon Atkinson and captained by Elaine Adkison, a basic average suction dredge.
AU Grabber	Bucket dredge	3-4	Both owned and built by Hank Schimschat, largest dredge in Nome as of Season 3.
Miss Nomer / The Dragon	Suction dredge	3	Both owned and built by Glenn LeBaron, the Miss Nomer is a simple set of floats with suction dredge equipment. The Dragon was lost before the season started, washed away by sea ice. Having an underwater sluicebox makes this dredge unusual.
Minnow (for the start of Season 3); Reaper (from the end of Season 3 onwards)	Suction dredge	3-	A basic average suction dredge. Built and captained by Steve Riedel as the Minnow; Later acquired by Brad Kelly and run as the Reaper
Loko	Suction dredge	4-	Both owned and built by Dave Magliocca and Kris Kelly. A basic average suction dredge.
Myrtle Irene	Bucket dredge	10-	

=== Under The Ice dredges ===
Dredge	Type	Seasons	Details
Lazy Gator	Suction dredge	1	Both owned and built by Joe Fullwood, a simple set of floats with suction dredge equipment.
Shamrock	Suction dredge	1-	Both owned and built by the Pomrenkes, a simple set of floats with suction dredge equipment.
The Clark / The Dragon (for Season 2)	Suction dredge	1-	Both owned and built by Zeke Tenhoff, a basic average suction dredge. Used The Dragon for season 2, having an underwater sluicebox makes this dredge unusual.
Wild Ranger / The Golden Seahorse (for Season 4)	Suction dredge	2-	Owned by Vernon Atkinson, a basic average suction dredge. Used The Golden Seahorse subdredge for season 4, having an underwater sluicebox makes, being mechanically controlled and 15x more efficient than a diver on a hose makes this dredge unusual.
Anchor Management	Suction dredge	2	Both captained and built by Scott Meisterheim, a basic average suction dredge.
Steve's World On Ice	Suction dredge	2	Both owned and built by Steve Riedel, a basic average suction dredge.
Miss Nomer / The Dragon (for Season 3)	Suction dredge	3	Both owned and built by Glen LeBaron, the Miss Nomer is a simple set of floats with suction dredge equipment. The Dragon was used on The Clark for season 2 and the Miss Nomer for season 3.
The Reaper	Suction dredge	3-	Both captained and re-built by Brad Kelly, a basic average suction dredge.
The Eroica / The Dragon Slayer (for Season 3)	Suction dredge	3-	Owned by Emily Reidel, a simple set of floats with suction dredge equipment. Used The Dragon Slayer for season 3, like The Dragon, having an underwater sluicebox makes this dredge unusual.
Paddy Wagon	Suction dredge	4	Co-Owned and built by the Kelly brothers and captained by Kris Kelly, a basic average suction dredge.

== Series overview ==
Year	Season Number	Episodes	Special(s)	Average U.S. viewers (million)	Originally aired	
Year	Season Number	Episodes	Special(s)	Average U.S. viewers (million)	Season premiere	Season finale
1	BSG S1	8	2	3.04	January 27, 2012	March 16, 2012
1 ICE	BSG:Under the Ice S1	5		1.66	August 24, 2012	September 21, 2012
2	BSG S2	12	2	2.20	January 4, 2013	March 29, 2013
2 ICE	BSG:Under the Ice S2	5		2.16	November 8, 2013	December 6, 2013
3	BSG S3	11		2.36	January 3, 2014	March 14, 2014
3 ICE	BSG:Under the Ice S3	8		2.22	August 22, 2014	October 3, 2014
4	BSG S4	11			March 13, 2015	May 15, 2015
4 ICE	BSG S5	6			September 4, 2015	October 9, 2015
5	BSG S6	10	2		March 30, 2016	June 8, 2016
5 ICE	BSG S7	7			August 26, 2016	October 7, 2016
6	BSG S8	10	2		February 1, 2017	April 5, 2017
6 ICE	BSG S9	8	2		August 11, 2017	November 29, 2017
7	BSG S10	10	2		March 30, 2018	June 15, 2018
8	BSG S11	11	2		September 17, 2019	November 12, 2019
9	BSG S12	11	2		May 8, 2020	October 9, 2020
10	BSG S13	10	1		April 30, 2021	July 2, 2021
10 ICE	BSG S14	10			October 26, 2021	December 28, 2021
11	BSG S15	10	2		December 6, 2022	February 7, 2023
12	BSG S16	10			August 1, 2023	October 3, 2023
12 ICE	BSG S17	12			October 6, 2023	December 22, 2023
13	BSG S18	12			August 16, 2024	October 18, 2024

== Gold totals ==
=== Season 1 ===
Christine Rose
Ep.	Oz.	Dollar value
1.	45.00 oz.	$72,000.00
2.	50.00 oz.	$78,000.00
3.	75.00 oz.	$125,000.00
4.	96.00 oz.	$155,238.00
5.	98.00 oz.	$166,000.00
6.	112.00 oz.	$196,000.00
7.	110.00 oz.	$192,500.00
8.	166.00 oz.	$283,220.00
Total	766.00 oz.	$1,302,200.00

Sluicey
Ep.	Oz.	Dollar value
1.	0.00 oz.	$0.00
2.	3.00 oz.	$4,700.00
3.	3.00 oz.	$5,200.00
4.	4.00 oz.	$6,400.00
5.	2.00 oz.	$3,400.00
6.	3.60 oz.	$6,400.00
7.	3.00 oz.	$5,250.00
8.	19.00 oz.	$36,000.00
Total	44.60 oz.	$75,820.00

The Clark
Ep.	Oz.	Dollar value
1.	5.00 oz.	$8,225.00
2.	1.50 oz.	$2,175.00
3.	9.50 oz.	$16,000.00
4.	7.00 oz.	$11,300.00
5.	3.40 oz.	$5,780.00
6.	4.00 oz.	$7,000.00
7.	8.00 oz.	$14,000.00
8.	0.00 oz.	$0.00
Total	38.40 oz.	$65,280.00

Wild Ranger
Ep.	Oz.	Dollar value
1.	0.00 oz.	$0.00
2.	0.25 oz.	$400.00
3.	0.25 oz.	$425.00
4.	0.25 oz.	$425.00
5.	0.00 oz.	$0.00
6.	0.00 oz.	$0.00
7.	0.00 oz.	$0.00
8.	0.00 oz.	$0.00
Total	0.75 oz.	$1,250.00

=== Season 1 ICE ===
Lazy Gator
Ep.	Oz.	Dollar value
1.	0.00 oz.	$0.00
2.	0.00 oz.	$0.00
3.	27.52 oz.	$45,174.08
4.	21.00 oz.	$34,471.50
5.	47.43 oz.	$77,856.35
Total	95.95 oz.	$157,501.93

Shamrock
Ep.	Oz.	Dollar value
1.	0.00 oz.	$0.00
2.	0.00 oz.	$0.00
3.	6.50 oz.	$10,669.75
4.	9.00 oz.	$14,773.50
5.	53.95 oz.	$88,558.93
Total	69.45 oz.	$114,002.18

The Clark
Ep.	Oz.	Dollar value
1.	0.00 oz.	$0.00
2.	0.00 oz.	$0.00
3.	0.00 oz.	$0.00
4.	2.00 oz.	$3,283.00
5.	5.70 oz.	$9,356.55
Total	7.70 oz.	$12,639.55

=== Season 2 ===
Christine Rose
Ep.	Oz.	Dollar value
1.	33.00 oz.	$55,202.24
2.	54.00 oz.	$90,331.20
3.	34.20 oz.	$57,209.76
4.	23.12 oz.	$38,675.14
5.	63.21 oz.	$105,737.69
6.	12.50 oz.	$20,910.00
7.	24.22 oz.	$40,515.22
8.	30.70 oz.	$51,354.96
9.	120.00 oz.	$200,736.00
10.	115.21 oz.	$192,723.29
11.	113.45 oz.	$189,779.16
12.	102.34 oz.	$171,194.35
Total	725.95 oz.	$1,214,369.16

Wild Ranger
Ep.	Oz.	Dollar value
1.	0.00 oz.	$0.00
2.	0.00 oz.	$0.00
3.	0.85 oz.	$1,421.88
4.	7.45 oz.	$12,462.36
5.	7.70 oz.	$12,880.56
6.	4.30 oz.	$7,193.04
7.	2.00 oz.	$3,345.60
8.	1.20 oz.	$2,007.36
9.	10.30 oz.	$17,229.84
10.	19.82 oz.	$33,154.90
11.	18.04 oz.	$30,177.31
12.	12.34 oz.	$20,642.35
Total	84.00 oz.	$140,515.20

The Edge
Ep.	Oz.	Dollar value
1.	0.00 oz.	$0.00
2.	5.10 oz.	$8,531.28
3.	2.20 oz.	$3,680.16
4.	0.00 oz.	$0.00
5.	2.20 oz.	$3,680.16
6.	2.30 oz.	$3,847.44
7.	1.70 oz.	$2,843.76
8.	7.50 oz.	$12,546.00
9.	1.60 oz.	$2,676.48
10.	8.70 oz.	$14,553.36
11.	7.65 oz.	$12,796.92
12.	7.05 oz.	$11,793.24
Total	46.00 oz.	$76,948.80

Anchor Management
Ep.	Oz.	Dollar value
1.	0.00 oz.	$0.00
2.	0.00 oz.	$0.00
3.	0.00 oz.	$0.00
4.	0.25 oz.	$418.20
5.	2.25 oz.	$3,763.80
6.	0.00 oz.	$0.00
7.	0.00 oz.	$0.00
8.	0.00 oz.	$0.00
9.	0.00 oz.	$0.00
10.	0.00 oz.	$0.00
11.	0.00 oz.	$0.00
12.	0.50 oz.	$836.40
Total	3.00 oz.	$5,018.40

=== Season 2 ICE ===
The Clark
Ep.	Oz.	Dollar value
1.	16.63 oz.	$20,400.00
2.	26.73 oz.	$38,000.00
3.	0.00 oz.	$0.00
4.	13.50 oz.	$18,900.00
5.	18.65 oz.	$26,110.00
Total	75.51 oz.	$103,410.00

Shamrock
Ep.	Oz.	Dollar value
1.	0.00 oz.	$0.00
2.	5.00 oz.	$7,000.00
3.	0.00 oz.	$0.00
4.	3.00 oz.	$4,200.00
5.	22.00 oz.	$30,800.00
Total	30.00 oz.	$42,000.00

Wild Ranger
Ep.	Oz.	Dollar value
1.	0.00 oz.	$0.00
2.	0.00 oz.	$0.00
3.	2.42 oz.	$3,388.00
4.	0.00 oz.	$0.00
5.	7.50 oz.	$10,500.00
Total	9.92 oz.	$13,888.00

Anchor Management
Ep.	Oz.	Dollar value
1.	0.00 oz.	$0.00
2.	0.21 oz.	$294.00
3.	0.76 oz.	$1,064.00
4.	0.00 oz.	$0.00
5.	4.04 oz.	$5,656.00
Total	5.01 oz.	$7,014.00

Steve's World On Ice
Ep.	Oz.	Dollar value
1.	0.00 oz.	$0.00
2.	0.00 oz.	$0.00
3.	0.00 oz.	$0.00
4.	0.26 oz.	$364.00
5.	0.74 oz.	$1,036.00
Total	1.00 oz.	$1,400.00

=== Season 3 ===
Christine Rose
Ep.	Oz.	Dollar value
1.	21.00 oz.	$27,000.00
2.	0.00 oz.	$0.00
3.	0.00 oz.	$0.00
4.	56.00 oz.	$73,000.00
5.	0.00 oz.	$0.00
6.	225.00 oz.	$292,500.00
7.	150.00 oz.	$195,000.00
8.	112.50 oz.	$146,250.00
9.	110.03 oz.	$143,039.00
10.	85.75 oz.	$111,475.00
11.	87.90 oz.	$114,270.00
Total	848.18 oz.	$1,102,634.00

AU Grabber
Ep.	Oz.	Dollar value
1.	0.00 oz.	$0.00
2.	0.00 oz.	$0.00
3.	3.60 oz.	$4,680.00
4.	0.00 oz.	$0.00
5.	0.00 oz.	$0.00
6.	0.00 oz.	$0.00
7.	16.00 oz.	$20,800.00
8.	13.50 oz.	$17,550.00
9.	0.00 oz.	$0.00
10.	48.80 oz.	$63,440.00
11.	90.10 oz.	$117,130.00
Total	172.00 oz.	$223,600.00

The Eroica
Ep.	Oz.	Dollar value
1.	0.00 oz.	$0.00
2.	0.00 oz.	$0.00
3.	12.36 oz.	$16,068.00
4.	0.00 oz.	$0.00
5.	10.00 oz.	$13,000.00
6.	0.00 oz.	$0.00
7.	0.00 oz.	$0.00
8.	0.00 oz.	$0.00
9.	25.00 oz.	$32,500.00
10.	24.00 oz.	$31,200.00
11.	33.10 oz.	$43,030.00
Total	104.46 oz.	$135,798.00

Wild Ranger
Ep.	Oz.	Dollar value
1.	0.00 oz.	$0.00
2.	6.50 oz.	$8,450.00
3.	0.00 oz.	$0.00
4.	1.20 oz.	$910.00
5.	0.00 oz.	$0.00
6.	1.67 oz.	$2,171.00
7.	3.80 oz.	$4,940.00
8.	7.08 oz.	$9,209.00
9.	0.00 oz.	$0.00
10.	0.00 oz.	$0.00
11.	0.00 oz.	$0.00
Total	20.25 oz.	$26,330.00

Miss Nomer
Ep.	Oz.	Dollar value
1.	0.00 oz.	$0.00
2.	0.00 oz.	$0.00
3.	0.00 oz.	$0.00
4.	0.00 oz.	$0.00
5.	0.00 oz.	$0.00
6.	0.00 oz.	$0.00
7.	0.03 oz.	$125.76
8.	0.00 oz.	$0.00
9.	11.76 oz.	$15.288.00
10.	0.00 oz.	$0.00
11.	5.04 oz.	$6,552.00
Total	16.83 oz.	$21,965.76

Minnow
Ep.	Oz.	Dollar value
1.	0.00 oz.	$0.00
2.	0.00 oz.	$0.00
3.	0.75 oz.	$975.00
4.	0.00 oz.	$0.00
5.	2.50 oz.	$3,250.00
6.	1.00 oz.	$1,300.00
7.	0.00 oz.	$0.00
8.	0.00 oz.	$0.00
9.	4.77 oz.	$6,201.00
10.	0.00 oz.	$0.00
11.	0.00 oz.	$0.00
Total	9.02 oz.	$11,726.00

Reaper
Ep.	Oz.	Dollar value
1.	0.00 oz.	$0.00
2.	0.00 oz.	$0.00
3.	0.00 oz.	$0.00
4.	0.00 oz.	$0.00
5.	0.00 oz.	$0.00
6.	0.00 oz.	$0.00
7.	0.00 oz.	$0.00
8.	0.00 oz.	$0.00
9.	0.00 oz.	$0.00
10.	0.00 oz.	$0.00
11.	2.00 oz.	$2,600.00
Total	2.00 oz.	$2,600.00

=== Season 3 ICE ===
Wild Ranger
Ep.	Oz.	Dollar value
1.	0.00 oz.	$0.00
2.	32.60 oz.	$41,858.40
3.	28.84 oz.	$37,030.56
4.	38.77 oz.	$49,780.68
5.	16.17 oz.	$20,762.28
6.	0.00 oz.	$0.00
7.	0.00 oz.	$0.00
8.	61.71 oz.	$79,235.64
Total	178.09 oz.	$228,667.56

Shamrock
Ep.	Oz.	Dollar value
1.	0.00 oz.	$0.00
2.	30.95 oz.	$39,739.80
3.	0.00 oz.	$0.00
4.	0.00 oz.	$0.00
5.	0.00 oz.	$0.00
6.	0.00 oz.	$0.00
7.	0.00 oz.	$0.00
8.	37.85 oz.	$48,599.40
Total	68.80 oz.	$88,339.20

Miss Nomer
Ep.	Oz.	Dollar value
1.	0.00 oz.	$0.00
2.	17.64 oz.	$22,649.76
3.	10.32 oz.	$13,250.88
4.	3.05 oz.	$3,916.20
5.	0.00 oz.	$0.00
6.	0.00 oz.	$0.00
7.	0.00 oz.	$0.00
8.	7.25 oz.	$9,309.00
Total	38.26 oz.	$49,125.84

The Reaper
Ep.	Oz.	Dollar value
1.	0.00 oz.	$0.00
2.	6.15 oz.	$7,896.60
3.	7.14 oz.	$9,167.76
4.	0.00 oz.	$0.00
5.	0.00 oz.	$0.00
6.	0.00 oz.	$0.00
7.	0.00 oz.	$0.00
8.	20.09 oz.	$25,795.56
Total	33.38 oz.	$42,859.92

The Clark
Ep.	Oz.	Dollar value
1.	0.00 oz.	$0.00
2.	0.00 oz.	$0.00
3.	0.00 oz.	$0.00
4.	0.00 oz.	$0.00
5.	0.00 oz.	$0.00
6.	0.00 oz.	$0.00
7.	0.00 oz.	$0.00
8.	5.53 oz.	$7,100.52
Total	5.53 oz.	$7,100.52

The Eroica
Ep.	Oz.	Dollar value
1.	0.00 oz.	$0.00
2.	0.00 oz.	$0.00
3.	0.00 oz.	$0.00
4.	0.00 oz.	$0.00
5.	0.00 oz.	$0.00
6.	1.00 oz.	$1,284.00
7.	0.00 oz.	$0.00
8.	3.18 oz.	$4,083.12
Total	4.18 oz.	$5,367.12

=== Season 4 ===
Christine Rose
Ep.	Oz.	Dollar value
1.	62.50 oz.	$75,000.00
2.	92.00 oz.	$110,400.00
3.	104.00 oz.	$124,800.00
4.	181.00 oz.	$217,200.00
5.	167.00 oz.	$200,400.00
6.	44.80 oz.	$53,760.00
7.	176.50 oz.	$211,800.00
8.	0.00 oz.	$0.00
9.	104.00 oz.	$124,800.00
10.	214.00 oz.	$256,800.00
Total	1,145.80 oz.	$1,374,960.00

AU Grabber
Ep.	Oz.	Dollar value
1.	12.00 oz.	$14,400.00
2.	0.00 oz.	$0.00
3.	33.40 oz.	$40,080.00
4.	23.70 oz.	$28,440.00
5.	34.60 oz.	$41,520.00
6.	29.70 oz.	$35,640.00
7.	0.00 oz.	$0.00
8.	108.60 oz.	$130,320.00
9.	159.80 oz.	$191,760.00
10.	91.20 oz.	$109,440.00
Total	493.00 oz.	$591,600.00

Wild Ranger
Ep.	Oz.	Dollar value
1.	19.85 oz.	$23,820.00
2.	8.30 oz.	$9,960.00
3.	9.13 oz.	$10,956.00
4.	5.00 oz.	$6,000.00
5.	12.50 oz.	$15,000.00
6.	10.40 oz.	$12,480.00
7.	2.00 oz.	$2,400.00
8.	6.65 oz.	$7,980.00
9.	0.00 oz.	$0.00
10.	43.50 oz.	$52,200.00
Total	189.50 oz.	$227,400.00

The Eroica
Ep.	Oz.	Dollar value
1.	0.00 oz.	$0.00
2.	7.20 oz.	$8,640.00
3.	13.80 oz.	$16,560.00
4.	7.90 oz.	$9,480.00
5.	9.00 oz.	$10,800.00
6.	4.90 oz.	$5,880.00
7.	9.97 oz.	$11,964.00
8.	30.73 oz.	$36,876.00
9.	22.90 oz.	$27,480.00
10.	43.95 oz.	$52,740.00
Total	150.30 oz.	$180,420.00

The Clark
Ep.	Oz.	Dollar value
1.	0.00 oz.	$0.00
2.	6.40 oz.	$7,680.00
3.	5.25 oz.	$6,200.00
4.	5.00 oz.	$6,000.00
5.	12.50 oz.	$15,000.00
6.	10.40 oz.	$12,480.00
7.	2.00 oz.	$2,400.00
8.	6.65 oz.	$7,980.00
9.	5.00 oz.	$6,000.00
10.	2.00 oz.	$2,400.00
Total	55.20 oz.	$66,240.00

Reaper
Ep.	Oz.	Dollar value
1.	0.00 oz.	$0.00
2.	0.00 oz.	$0.00
3.	0.00 oz.	$0.00
4.	2.72 oz.	$3,264.00
5.	3.50 oz.	$4,200.00
6.	4.67 oz.	$5,604.00
7.	0.00 oz.	$0.00
8.	2.01 oz.	$2,412.00
9.	11.20 oz.	$13,440.00
10.	24.10 oz.	$28,920.00
Total	48.20 oz.	$57,936.00

Loko
Ep.	Oz.	Dollar value
1.	0.00 oz.	$0.00
2.	0.00 oz.	$0.00
3.	0.00 oz.	$0.00
4.	0.00 oz.	$0.00
5.	0.00 oz.	$0.00
6.	0.00 oz.	$0.00
7.	0.00 oz.	$0.00
8.	5.00 oz.	$6,000.00
9.	5.00 oz.	$6,000.00
10.	17.93 oz.	$21,516.00
Total	27.93 oz.	$33,516.00

=== Season 5 ICE ===
Wild Ranger
Ep.	Oz.	Dollar value
1.	2.00 oz.	$2,400.00
2.	7.25 oz.	$8,700.00
3.	0.00 oz.	$0.00
4.	0.00oz.	$0.00
5.	5.70 oz.	$6,840.00
6.	27.40 oz.	$32,880.00
Total	42.35 oz.	$50,820.00

Shamrock
Ep.	Oz.	Dollar value
1.	0.00 oz.	$0.00
2.	1.00 oz.	$1,200.00
3.	0.00 oz.	$0.00
4.	1.00 oz.	$1,200.00
5.	2.50 oz.	$3,000.00
6.	9.30 oz.	$11,160.00
Total	13.80 oz.	$16,560.20

The Clark
Ep.	Oz.	Dollar value
1.	0.00 oz.	$0.00
2.	2.82 oz.	$3,384.00
3.	0.00oz	$0.00
4.	2.88 oz.	$3,456.00
5.	1.00 oz.	$1,200.00
6.	5.10 oz.	$6,120.00
Total	11.80 oz.	$14,160.00

Paddy Wagon
Ep.	Oz.	Dollar value
1.	0.50 oz.	$600.00
2.	0.00 oz.	$0.00
3.	0.00 oz.	$0.00
4.	2.10 oz.	$2,520.00
5.	0.00 oz.	$0.00
6.	0.00 oz.	$0.00
Total	2.60 oz.	$3,120.00

The Reaper
Ep.	Oz.	Dollar value
1.	0.00 oz.	$0.00
2.	0.00 oz.	$0.00
3.	1.50 oz.	$1,800.00
4.	1.00 oz.	$1,200.00
5.	0.00 oz.	$0.00
6.	0.00 oz.	$0.00
Total	2.50 oz.	$3,000.00

=== Season 6 ===
Christine Rose
Ep.	Oz.	Dollar value
1.	77.15 oz.	$92,580.00
2.	0.00 oz.	$0.00
3.	111.10 oz.	$136,098.00
4.	53.00 oz.	$63,600.00
5.	58.95 oz.	$70,740.00
6.	0.00 oz.	$0.00
7.	0.00 oz.	$0.00
8.	0.00 oz.	$0.00
9.	0.00 oz.	$0.00
10.	47.20 oz.	$56,640.00
Total	347.40 oz.	$419,658.00

High Noon
Ep.	Oz.	Dollar value
1.	0.00 oz.	$0.00
2.	0.00 oz.	$0.00
3.	7.98 oz.	$9,776.00
4.	12.20 oz.	$14,440.00
5.	0.00 oz.	$0.00
6.	14.12 oz.	$16,944.00
7.	0.00 oz.	$0.00
8.	17.21 oz.	$20,652.00
9.	0.00 oz.	$0.00
10.	79.60 oz.	$95,520.00
Total	158.13 oz.	$189,756.00

The Havilah
Ep.	Oz.	Dollar value
1.	8.64 oz.	$10,368.00
2.	0.00 oz.	$0.00
3.	14.2 oz.	$17,395.00
4.	16.16 oz.	$19,392.00
5.	10.85 oz.	$13,020.00
6.	0.00 oz.	$0.00
7.	28.35 oz.	$34,020.00
8.	20.70 oz.	$12,840.00
9.	0.00 oz.	$0.00
10.	0.00 oz.	$0.00
Total	98.90 oz.	$107,035.00

Steve Pomrenke Inland Mining
Ep.	Oz.	Dollar value
1.	0.00 oz.	$0.00
2.	0.00 oz.	$0.00
3.	0.00 oz.	$0.00
4.	0.00 oz.	$0.00
5.	0.00 oz.	$0.00
6.	0.00 oz.	$0.00
7.	0.00 oz.	$0.00
8.	176.20 oz.	$211,440.00
9.	0.00 oz.	$0.00
10.	2,102.50 oz.	$2,523,000.00
Total	2,278.70 oz.	$2,734,440.00

The Eroica
Ep.	Oz.	Dollar value
1.	0.00 oz.	$0.00
2.	10.76 oz.	$12,912.00
3.	16.88 oz.	$20,678.00
4.	0.00 oz.	$0.00
5.	9.80 oz.	$11,760.00
6.	0.00 oz.	$0.00
7.	0.00 oz.	$0.00
8.	0.00 oz.	$0.00
9.	0.00 oz.	$0.00
10.	21.10 oz.	$25,320.00
Total	58.54 oz.	$70,670.00

Vernon Adkison - All In
Ep.	Oz.	Dollar value
1.	0.00 oz.	$0.00
2.	0.00 oz.	$0.00
3.	0.00 oz.	$0.00
4.	0.00 oz.	$0.00
5.	0.00 oz.	$0.00
6.	14.12 oz.	$16,944.00
7.	0.00 oz.	$0.00
8.	0.00 oz.	$0.00
9.	0.29 oz.	$348.00
10.	0.00 oz.	$0.00
Total	14.41 oz.	$17,292.00

The Reaper
Ep.	Oz.	Dollar value
1.	0.00 oz.	$0.00
2.	0.00 oz.	$0.00
3.	0.00 oz.	$0.00
4.	0.00 oz.	$0.00
5.	8.47 oz.	$7450.00
6.	0.00 oz.	$0.00
7.	21.90 oz.	$26,280.00
8.	0.00 oz.	$0.00
9.	0.00 oz.	$0.00
10.	0.00 oz.	$0.00
Total	30.37 oz.	$33,730.00

=== Season 7 ICE ===
"Mr. Gold" - Shawn Pomrenke
Ep.	Oz.	Dollar value
1.	0.00 oz.	$0.00
2.	3.22 oz.	$4,186.00
3.	1.67 oz.	$2,171.00
4.	5.98 oz.	$7,774.00
5.	6.28 oz.	$8,164.00
6.	5.28 oz.	$6,864.00
7.	11.70 oz.	$15,210.00
Total	34.13 oz.	$44,369.00

High Noon
Ep.	Oz.	Dollar value
1.	0.00 oz.	$0.00
2.	0.00 oz.	$0.00
3.	6.69 oz.	$8,697.00
4.	5.14 oz.	$6,682.00
5.	7.78 oz.	$10,114.00
6.	3.40 oz.	$4,420.00
7.	16.96 oz.	$22,048.00
Total	39.97 oz.	$51,961.00

Wild Ranger
Ep.	Oz.	Dollar value
1.	0.00 oz.	$0.00
2.	7.20 oz.	$9,360.00
3.	0.00 oz.	$0.00
4.	9.04 oz.	$11,752.00
5.	17.34 oz.	$22,542.00
6.	17.71 oz.	$23,023.00
7.	20.62 oz.	$26,806.00
Total	71.91 oz.	$93,483.00

The Clark
Ep.	Oz.	Dollar value
1.	0.00 oz.	$0.00
2.	5.68 oz.	$7,380.00
3.	0.00 oz.	$0.00
4.	9.78 oz.	$12,718.00
5.	0.00 oz.	$0.00
6.	0.00 oz.	$0.00
7.	9.22 oz.	$11,986.00
Total	24.68 oz.	$32,084.00

The Reaper
Ep.	Oz.	Dollar value
1.	0.00 oz.	$0.00
2.	0.00 oz.	$0.00
3.	0.00 oz.	$0.00
4.	1.75 oz.	$2,275.00
5.	0.00 oz.	$0.00
6.	3.56 oz.	$4,628.00
7.	3.43 oz.	$4,459.00
Total	8.74 oz.	$11,362.00

=== Season 8 ===
Shawn Pomrenke
Ep.	Oz.	Dollar value
1.	0.00 oz.	$0.00
2.	41.80 oz.	$54,340.00
3.	0.00 oz.	$0.00
4.	6.20 oz.	$8,060.00
5.	45.00 oz.	$58,500.00
6.	0.00 oz.	$0.00
7.	768.00 oz.	$998,400.00
8.	0.00 oz.	$0.00
9.	0.00 oz.	$0.00
10.	1,316.00 oz.	$1,560,000.00
Total	2,177.00 oz.	$2,679,300.00

Zeke & Emily
Ep.	Oz.	Dollar value
1.	0.00 oz.	$0.00
2.	0.00 oz.	$0.00
3.	0.00 oz.	$0.00
4.	0.00 oz.	$0.00
5.	0.00 oz.	$0.00
6.	0.00 oz.	$0.00
7.	0.00 oz.	$0.00
8.	21.10 oz.	$27,430.00
9.	0.00 oz.	$0.00
10.	6.08 oz.	$7,904.00
Total	27.18 oz.	$35,334.00

Kris Kelly
Ep.	Oz.	Dollar value
1.	0.00 oz.	$0.00
2.	0.00 oz.	$0.00
3.	3.80 oz.	$4,940.00
4.	0.00 oz.	$0.00
5.	0.00 oz.	$0.00
6.	0.00 oz.	$0.00
7.	11.70 oz.	$15,210.00
8.	2.88 oz.	$3,744.00
9.	0.00 oz.	$0.00
10.	14.20 oz.	$18,460.00
Total	32.58 oz.	$42,354.00

George Young
Ep.	Oz.	Dollar value
1.	0.00 oz.	$0.00
2.	0.00 oz.	$0.00
3.	0.00 oz.	$0.00
4.	0.00 oz.	$0.00
5.	1.50 oz.	$1,950.00
6.	0.00 oz.	$0.00
7.	10.38 oz.	$13,494.00
8.	2.00 oz.	$2,600.00
9.	8.55 oz.	$11,115.00
10.	0.00 oz.	$0.00
Total	22.43 oz.	$29,159.00

=== Season 9 ICE ===
Shawn Pomrenke
Ep.	Oz.	Dollar value
1.	0.00 oz.	$0.00
2.	0.00 oz.	$0.00
3.	12.00 oz.	$15,600.00
4.	19.50 oz.	$25,350.00
5.	31.46 oz.	$40,898.00
6.	0.00 oz.	$0.00
7.	0.00 oz.	$0.00
8.	57.04 oz.	$74,152.00
Total	120.00 oz.	$156,000.00

Emily Riedel
Ep.	Oz.	Dollar value
1.	0.00 oz.	$0.00
2.	2.70 oz.	$3,510.00
3.	0.00 oz.	$0.00
4.	0.00 oz.	$0.00
5.	0.00 oz.	$0.00
6.	2.00 oz.	$2,600.00
7.	1.80 oz.	$2,340.00
8.	0.00 oz.	$0.00
Total	6.50 oz.	$8,450.00

Zeke Tenhoff
Ep.	Oz.	Dollar value
1.	0.00 oz.	$0.00
2.	0.00 oz.	$0.00
3.	0.00 oz.	$0.00
4.	0.00 oz.	$0.00
5.	0.00 oz.	$0.00
6.	0.00 oz.	$0.00
7.	0.00 oz.	$0.00
8.	16.64 oz.	$21,632.00
Total	16.64 oz.	$21,632.00

Kris Kelly
Ep.	Oz.	Dollar value
1.	0.00 oz.	$0.00
2.	0.00 oz.	$0.00
3.	9.30 oz.	$12,090.00
4.	0.00 oz.	$0.00
5.	0.00 oz.	$0.00
6.	4.80 oz.	$6,240.00
7.	0.00 oz.	$0.00
8.	9.50 oz.	$12,350.00
Total	23.60 oz.	$30680.00

=== Season 10 ===
Shawn Pomrenke
Ep.	Oz.	Dollar value
1.	104.00 oz.	$135,200.00
2.	0.00 oz.	$0.00
3.	52.00 oz.	$67,600.00
4.	0.00 oz.	$0.00
5.	0.00 oz.	$0.00
6.	81.50 oz.	$105,950.00
7.	88.90 oz.	$115,570.00
8.	0.00 oz.	$0.00
9.	72.30 oz.	$93,990.00
10.	204.70 oz.	$266,110.00
11.	187.00 oz.	$243,100.00
Total	790.40 oz.	$1,027,520.00

George Young
Ep.	Oz.	Dollar value
1.	0.00 oz.	$0.00
2.	0.00 oz.	$0.00
3.	0.00 oz.	$0.00
4.	11.33 oz.	$14,729.00
5.	0.00 oz.	$0.00
6.	0.00 oz.	$0.00
7.	0.00 oz.	$0.00
8.	0.00 oz.	$0.00
9.	0.00 oz.	$0.00
10.	9.97 oz.	$12,961.00
11.	0.00 oz.	$0.00
Total	21.30 oz.	$27,690.00

Kris Kelly
Ep.	Oz.	Dollar value
1.	0.00 oz.	$0.00
2.	0.00 oz.	$0.00
3.	0.00 oz.	$0.00
4.	32.00 oz.	$41,600.00
5.	0.00 oz.	$0.00
6.	0.00 oz.	$0.00
7.	43.00 oz.	$55,900.00
8.	0.00 oz.	$0.00
9.	18.50 oz.	$24,050.00
10.	0.00 oz.	$0.00
11.	36.50 oz.	$47,450.00
Total	130.00 oz.	$169,000.00

Emily Riedel
Ep.	Oz.	Dollar value
1.	0.00 oz.	$0.00
2.	12.80 oz.	$16,640.00
3.	17.10 oz.	$22,230.00
4.	33.80 oz.	$43,840.00
5.	45.40 oz.	$59,120.00
6.	0.00 oz.	$0.00
7.	27.50 oz.	$35,750.00
8.	25.70 oz.	$33,410.00
9.	45.00 oz.	$58,500.00
10.	70.00 oz.	$91,000.00
11.	39.70 oz.	$51,610.00
Total	317.00 oz.	$412,100.00

Ken Kerr
Ep.	Oz.	Dollar value
1.	0.00 oz.	$0.00
2.	0.00 oz.	$0.00
3.	25.60 oz.	$33,280.00
4.	0.00 oz.	$0.00
5.	0.00 oz.	$0.00
6.	0.00 oz.	$0.00
7.	0.00 oz.	$0.00
8.	29.50 oz.	$38,350.00
9.	262.70 oz.	$341,510.00
10.	199.15 oz.	$258,895.00
11.	68.30 oz.	$88,790.00
Total	585.25 oz.	$760,825.00

=== Season 11 ===
Shawn Pomrenke
Ep.	Oz.	Dollar value
1.	26.50 oz.	$31,800.00
2.	69.35 oz.	$83,220.00
3.	21.65 oz.	$25,980.00
4.	134.45 oz.	$161,340.00
5.	56.05 oz.	$67,260.00
6.	121.10 oz.	$145,320.00
7.	162.60 oz.	$195,120.00
8.	97.26 oz.	$116,700.00
9.	99.14 oz.	$118,980.00
10.	216.10 oz.	$259,320.00
Total	1,004.20 oz.	$1,205,040.00

Vernon Adkison
Ep.	Oz.	Dollar value
1.	0.00 oz.	$0.00
2.	0.00 oz.	$0.00
3.	1.00 oz.	$1,200.00
4.	0.00 oz.	$0.00
5.	0.00 oz.	$0.00
6.	0.00 oz.	$0.00
7.	1.00 oz.	$1,200.00
8.	0.00 oz.	$0.00
9.	0.00 oz.	$0.00
10.	28.20 oz.	$33,840.00
Total	30.20 oz.	$36,240.00

Kris Kelly
Ep.	Oz.	Dollar value
1.	15.60 oz.	$18,762.00
2.	0.00 oz.	$0.00
3.	4.00 oz.	$4,758.00
4.	0.00 oz.	$0.00
5.	0.00 oz.	$0.00
6.	0.00 oz.	$0.00
7.	0.00 oz.	$0.00
8.	6.22 oz.	$7,464.00
9.	0.00 oz.	$0.00
10.	13.00 oz.	$15,600.00
Total	38.82 oz.	$46,584.00

Emily Riedel
Ep.	Oz.	Dollar value
1.	0.00 oz.	$0.00
2.	24.25 oz.	$29,100.00
3.	0.00 oz.	$0.00
4.	0.00 oz.	$0.00
5.	9.16 oz.	$10,992.00
6.	15.48 oz.	$18,576.00
7.	24.65 oz.	$29,580.00
8.	14.00 oz.	$16,800.00
9.	13.00 oz.	$15,600.00
10.	21.10 oz.	$25,320.00
Total	121.64 oz.	$145,968.00

Ken Kerr
Ep.	Oz.	Dollar value
1.	0.00 oz.	$0.00
2.	0.00 oz.	$0.00
3.	111.76 oz.	$134,112.00
4.	147.94 oz.	$177,528.00
5.	0.00 oz.	$0.00
6.	156.50 oz.	$187,800.00
7.	183.40 oz.	$220,080.00
8.	0.00 oz.	$0.00
9.	217.00 oz.	$260,400.00
10.	344.00 oz.	$412,800.00
Total	1,160.60 oz.	$1,392,720.00

=== Season 12 ===
Ken Kerr
Ep.	Oz.	Dollar value
1.	124.40 oz.	$186,600.00
2.	144.10 oz.	$216,150.00
3.	133.54 oz.	$200,310.00
4.	124.70 oz.	$187,050.00
5.	330.50 oz.	$495,750.00
6.	330.38 oz.	$495,570.00
7.	0.00 oz.	$0.00
8.	275.00 oz.	$412,500.00
9.	0.00 oz.	$0.00
10.	309.70 oz.	$464,550.00
11.	0.00 oz.	$0.00
12.	283.21 oz.	$424,815.00
Total	2,055.53 oz.	$3,083,295.00

Vernon Adkison
Ep.	Oz.	Dollar value
1.	0.00 oz.	$0.00
2.	16.45 oz.	$24,675.00
3.	0.00 oz.	$0.00
4.	10.02 oz.	$15,030.00
5.	0.00 oz.	$0.00
6.	13.75 oz.	$20,625.00
7.	0.00 oz.	$0.00
8.	7.85 oz.	$11,775.00
9.	17.85 oz.	$26,775.00
10.	0.00 oz.	$0.00
11.	0.00 oz.	$0.00
12.	42.44 oz.	$63,660.00
Total	108.36 oz.	$162,540.00

Shawn Pomrenke
Ep.	Oz.	Dollar value
1.	0.00 oz.	$0.00
2.	267.10 oz.	$400,650.00
3.	120.00 oz.	$180,000.00
4.	127.50 oz.	$191,250.00
5.	170.20 oz.	$255,300.00
6.	223.80 oz.	$335,700.00
7.	0.00 oz.	$0.00
8.	376.80 oz.	$565,200.00
9.	141.00 oz.	$211,500.00
10.	343.70 oz.	$515,550.00
11.	0.00 oz.	$0.00
12.	309.40 oz.	$464,100.00
Total	2,079.50 oz.	$3,119,250.00

Emily Riedel
Ep.	Oz.	Dollar value
1.	15.00 oz.	$22,500.00
2.	0.00 oz.	$0.00
3.	19.08 oz.	$28,620.00
4.	5.02 oz.	$7,530.00
5.	22.90 oz.	$34,350.00
6.	48.00 oz.	$72,000.00
7.	0.00 oz.	$0.00
8.	73.70 oz.	$110,625.00
9.	55.67 oz.	$83,430.00
10.	32.00 oz.	$48,000.00
11.	0.00 oz.	$0.00
12.	68.09 oz.	$102,135.00
Total	339.46 oz.	$509,190.00

Kris Kelly
Ep.	Oz.	Dollar value
1.	0.00 oz.	$0.00
2.	9.40 oz.	$14,100.00
3.	5.00 oz.	$7,500.00
4.	0.00 oz.	$0.00
5.	11.15 oz.	$16,725.00
6.	14.15 oz.	$21,225.00
7.	0.00 oz.	$0.00
8.	21.20 oz.	$31,800.00
9.	0.00 oz.	$0.00
10.	19.40 oz.	$28,800.00
11.	0.00 oz.	$0.00
12.	21.25 oz.	$32,175.00
Total	101.55 oz.	$152,325.00

=== Season 12 ICE ===
Shawn Pomrenke
Ep.	Oz.	Dollar value
13.	25.20 oz.	$40,320.00
14.	29.75 oz.	$47,600.00
15.	35.40 oz.	$56,640.00
16.	64.95 oz.	$103,920.00
17.	0.00 oz.	$0.00
18.	33.80 oz.	$54,080.00
19.	25.95 oz.	$41,520.00
20.	0.00 oz.	$0.00
21.	30.20 oz.	$48,320.00
22.	34.50 oz.	$55,200.00
Total	279.75 oz.	$447,600.00

Vernon Adkison
Ep.	Oz.	Dollar value
13.	0 oz.	$0.00
14.	1.22 oz.	$1,952.00
15.	4.56 oz.	$7,296.00
16.	0 oz.	$0.00
17.	10.56 oz.	$16,896.00
18.	0 oz.	$0.00
19.	19.94 oz.	$31,904.00
20.	8.09 oz.	$12,944.00
21.	16.2 oz.	$25,920.00
22.	30.36 oz.	$48,576.00
Total	90.93 oz.	$145,488.00

Emily Riedel
Ep.	Oz.	Dollar value
13.	0.00 oz.	$0.00
14.	0.00 oz.	$0.00
15.	2.31 oz.	$3,696.00
16.	1.81 oz.	$2,896.00
17.	0.00 oz.	$0.00
18.	10.115 oz.	$16,184.00
19.	9.00 oz.	$14,400.00
20.	16.185 oz.	$25,896.00
21.	5.00 oz.	$8,000.00
22.	16.515 oz.	$26,424.00
Total	60.935 oz.	$97,496.00

Kris Kelly
Ep.	Oz.	Dollar value
13.	0 oz.	$0.00
14.	5.7 oz.	$9,120.00
15.	4.38 oz.	$7,008.00
16.	10.13 oz.	$16,208.00
17.	0 oz.	$0.00
18.	9.715 oz.	$15,544.00
19.	7.175 oz.	$11,480.00
20.	7.015 oz.	$11,224.00
21.	0 oz.	$0.00
22.	13.365 oz.	$21,384.00
Total	57.48 oz.	$91,968.00

== Syndication ==
Season 1

- (Canada) Discovery Channel Bering Sea Gold
- (United Kingdom) Discovery Channel Gold Divers
- (Poland) : Discovery Channel Morze złota
- (Germany) : DMAX Goldtaucher der Beringsee

Season 2

- (Canada) Discovery Channel Bering Sea Gold
- (United Kingdom) Discovery Channel Gold Divers
- (Poland) : Discovery Channel Morze złota
- (Germany) : DMAX Goldtaucher der Beringsee

== Legacy ==
With the popularity of the show, it has inspired many people to head to Nome, and suction dredge in Norton Bay. In 2015, over 100 gold dredges operated in the summer sea mining season, significantly more than before the TV show started.

== See also ==
- Gold mining in Alaska
