= Prospectors (TV series) =

American reality television series

- Genre: Reality
- Starring: Amanda Adkins; Steve Brancato; Dwayne Hall; Rich Fretterd; The Busse family The Dorris family The Cardwell family
- Country of origin: United States
- Original language: English
- No. of seasons: 4
- No. of episodes: 37

Production
- Production company: High Noon Entertainment

Original release
- Network: The Weather Channel
- Release: March 26, 2013 – February 14, 2016

Prospectors is a weekly American reality television series that aired from March 26, 2013, to February 14, 2016, on The Weather Channel. The show follows miners in the Colorado Rocky Mountains as they search for precious metals and gemstones.

== Cast ==
- Amanda Adkins is a miner with over 20 years' experience. She is originally from Capon Bridge, West Virginia, where she learned how to mine by watching her "Great Uncle, Oakley Adkins" (Edited by Caleb Adkins). She was also briefly a model, and even turned down modelling in France in order to continue mining gemstones. On April 24, 2013, she began working with her mining partner Travis Anderson. Travis was Steve Brancato's mining partner on season 1 (Who discovered Diane's Pocket, and lived with Amanda Adkins for a month before the filming of season 1) of Prospectors. On April 27, 2014, Amanda began hosting segments on a Jewelry Television special about American gem stones. In April 2015 Amanda removed 'Anderson' from her last name on her Facebook page because they were no longer a "common law" couple. According to Amanda, it will be announced on the new season she has split with mining partner and former partner Travis Anderson. In 2016, Amanda Adkins launched a website of exclusively USA mined gems, mineral specimens and jewelry that not only she dug herself, but also years of combined mining efforts from across the United States of America of gemstone mining families to bring genuine, natural gems, minerals and jewelry to the market. This a new niche in the market as of 2016 as a collaborative effort to bring American mined gemstones to the market from a network of USA mining teams. Amanda Adkins launched this website in an effort to help the gemstone mining families in America.
- Dwayne Hall mines aquamarine on Colorado's Mount White. He is originally from Kentucky, where he learned woodcarving. Dwayne came in second place in a world championship for woodcarving. After traveling around the country with his wife he decided to move to Colorado, where he began mining.
- Rich Fretterd has a combined total of 19 years' experience in mining, milling and surveying in Colorado. He is originally from Hudson, New York. Fretterd mines with his girlfriend and mining partner Jean Cowman. At his Godsend Claim, he found a U.S. record-breaking-sized smoky quartz crystal 4.5 ft (1.4 m) in length. Fretterd pleaded guilty to child sex charges in November 2018.
- The Busse family – Brian & Yolanda Busse mine aquamarine on Mount Antero with their sons, Brian Jr, David, Chris, Nathan, and Elijah. Brian has solely supported his family through prospecting since 1987. The Busse family has saved people from hypothermia, rollovers and other accidents.
- The Dorris family – Joe Dorris mines amazonite and smoky quartz. He is married to Susan Dorris and has three children, Scott, Tim, and Krystle, who help with the business. Scott isn't filmed on Prospectors. Joe, Tim, and Krystle are filmed mining on their claims. Tim is responsible for cleaning, and repairing specimens. Krystle attends gem shows and promotes the gems and jewelry. In addition to mining, Joe Dorris is an author. He has written and published three books and written a few articles on minerals and mining.
- The Cardwell family – Craig and Tracy Cardwell mine on Mount Antero. They have 16 claims from the South Knob to the Mount White Basin. Craig is the fourth generation in his family to mine on Mount Antero. Craig's grandfather, Grady, used a Caterpillar D9 to make a road to the top of Mount Antero.
- Charles (Chuck) Diehl Borland III – Helped behind the scenes for many years, driving up from Bozeman, Montana. He never wanted to be on camera, but just wanted to be a part of what was going on at the dig site. He died from pancreatic cancer on November 4, 2013. In addition to being interested in mining, he taught ninth-grade earth science in the Bozeman public-school system for 36 years, from 1968 to 2004, and inspired many youngsters to further study the beauty and complexity of the Earth and its treasures. He was a "go-to" expert for identifying field specimens and was at his happiest when talking about science and mineralogy with anyone who asked. When he died, he was 73 years old and left behind three children; the youngest was named Crystal Gem Borland.

== Episodes ==
=== Season 1 (2013) ===
No.	Title	Original release date
1	"Breaking the Dry Spell"	March 26, 2013
The Dorris family members need a big find to keep their season alive. Nearby, prospector Steve Brancato searches on Mount Antero, while Amanda Adkins discovers thieves at her dig site. Documentary series following people as they begin their seasonal hunt for gems and crystals in the Rocky Mountains of Colorado.
2	"A Dangerous Prospect"	March 26, 2013
Two miners rappel down a sheer cliff in their search for aquamarine on Colorado's Mount Antero, while a prospecting family makes a valuable find.
3	"A Hail of Boulders"	April 2, 2013
One gold hunter dares to mine under a moving wall of rocks, while a dangerous boulder threatens to ruin another digger's plans.
4	"The Mountain Shakes"	April 9, 2013
Steve Brancato thinks he found a large pocket of aquamarine; the Busse family tries to make their claim safe enough to mine; a lightning strike causes a rockslide on Amanda Adkins' dig.
5	"Claimjumpers"	April 16, 2013
In their annual visit to Mount Antero in the Colorado Rockies, the Dorris family gets caught in a thunderstorm, miles from safety; Amanda Adkins, Steve Brancato, and Daniel Barkus race to catch potential thieves.
6	"Thunder Snow"	April 23, 2013
The Dorris family continues to hunt for topaz, while Rich Fretterd mines for crystals. Meanwhile, on Mount Antero, the Busses family gets caught in a dangerous whiteout.
7	"Out of Reach"	May 14, 2013
Amanda's dig site on Mount Antero threatens to collapse when a snow storm hits. Meanwhile, Rich spots a blue topaz and must decide whether it is worth risking his life for it.
8	"The Mother Load"	May 21, 2013
On Colorado's Mount Antero, Steve Brancato must survive a sudden storm carrying thundersnow; the Busse family launches a search and rescue mission; the Dorris family makes the find of a lifetime.
9	"A Monster Pocket"	May 28, 2013
Amanda and Rich check out a secret location near Lake George, while the Dorris family uncovers a huge and unexpected pocket of gems.

=== Season 2 (2013) ===
No.	Title	Original release date
TBA	"The Sea 1son Begins"	October 27, 2013
The miners return to the mountains in Colorado in the Season 2 premiere, as Amanda and Dwayne are after aquamarine, and the Dorris family look for amazonite and smoky quartz. Meanwhile, Rich scopes out his next dig site.
2	"Intruders"	November 3, 2013
Amanda finds aquamarine in a dangerous place; Steve and Rich confront unwelcome visitors on their claims; the Dorris family make a spectacular find.
3	"Legendary Topaz"	November 10, 2013
Summertime in the Rocky Mountains in Colorado brings daily thunderstorms, which force Joe to abandon a promising pocket, while the Busse family must leave their dig site. Elsewhere, Steve digs for amazonite near Lake George; and Rich finds a lost cache of topaz.
4	"High Alert"	November 24, 2013
Evidence of claim-jumping forces the miners to go to extremes to protect their investments, including Joe, who pulls an all-nighter, while Amanda sets a trap on Colorado's Mount Antero.
5	"New Prospects"	December 8, 2013
Rich takes time off from mining to honor the memory of his brother with a donation; Amanda and her partner hunt for aquamarine on Colorado's Mount Antero; Brian's injuries present a new set of challenges.
6	"Risky Business"	December 15, 2013
Heavy rains create dangerous mining conditions; Amanda introduces Travis to her father; and Rich tunnels back into his topaz pocket.
7	"The Big Gamble"	December 22, 2013
Amanda digs for aquamarine in a dangerous spot; the Dorrises dig for topaz near Lake George; and Steve hunts for blue barite on the plains as the miners take bigger risks near the end of the season.
8	"The Big Score"	December 29, 2013
The arrival of autumn marks the beginning of the selling season for the Dorris and Busse families, but the quest for a big payday continues for the other miners, including Steve, who strikes a deal to mine a promising claim, and Amanda, who finishes cleaning out a lucrative aquamarine pocket.

=== Season 2 Specials (2013) ===
No.	Title	Original release date
1	"Behind.the.Scenes#1"	October 27, 2013
Special Episode 1
2	"Behind.the.Scenes#2"	December 25, 2013
Special Episode 2
3	"Jackpot"	December 29, 2013
Special Episode 3

=== Season 3 (2014–2015) ===
No.	Title	Original release date
1	"Ridin' the Pain Train"	December 7, 2014
In the Season 3 premiere, Amanda hits it big, even as tornadoes are bearing down on her and threatening the Dorrises' claims. Meanwhile, Dwayne teaches two new associates about mining; and the Busses' camp is vandalized.
2	"Poppin' Rocks"	December 14, 2014
Rich risks being buried alive while working beneath an overhang, the Cardwells use an excavator on Mount Antero, the Dorrises' operating costs may exceed their earnings, Dwayne's discovery could make history.
3	"Tommyknockers"	December 21, 2014
Brian saves the day on Mount Antero, the Dorrises discover rare specimens, Dwayne's dreams come true, Amanda finds her site vandalized and later senses the presence of a mythical Tommyknocker.
4	"Night Shift"	December 28, 2014
Amanda looks for topaz, the Busses hunt for aquamarine at night, the Cardwells suspect they've got company at their camp, Dwayne teaches his grandson the tricks of his trade.
5	"Money Pit"	January 11, 2015
Rich gets soaked in the rain while digging for topaz, Brian suffers an injury that could end his season, the Dorrises use explosives to reach gems underground, Amanda tries to stay focused in the presence of an unwanted visitor.
6	"Lightning Rod"	January 18, 2015
The Dorrises set off a blast at their amazonite claim, the Cardwells have a life-threatening scare, Homer finishes his work with Dwayne.
7	"Rain, Rain, Go Away"	January 18, 2015
The Busses deal with hail while digging for aquamarine, the Dorrises try to avoid cave-ins on their quest for fluorite, Dwayne's friend brings beginner's luck, Amanda mulls her future on Mount Antero.
8	"Payday Stone"	January 25, 2015
Brian looks for aquamarine that could be the biggest haul of the year for the Busses, Travis searches for a surprise for Amanda's wedding ring, Rich and the Dorrises hunt for topaz before the gem shows.
9	"Million Dollar Rocks"	February 1, 2015
The Busses go underground to find gold, Dwayne carves a statue of Mount Antero's namesake, Chief Antero of the Uintah band of Utes, the Dorrises reveal their largest amazonite and smoky quartz combination; the Cardwells find their biggest pocket yet.
10	"Topaz Envy"	February 9, 2015
Rich gets good news at the gem shows, Dwayne makes what could be his last trip to the Blue Rose; the Dorrises leave their machines to look for aquamarine.
11	"Jackpot 2"	2015-02-18
look back at some of the scariest moments on the mountain, dig deeper into how gems make it out of the earth, and marvel at the best finds.

=== Season 4 (2015–2016) ===
No.	Title	Original release date
1	"Rock Beats Blizzard"	December 7, 2015
Dwayne joins two veteran miners underground in order to investigate a silver ore vein. Amanda starts off the mining season with a fresh start, and a brand-new mining partner. The Dorris family begin the season on their topaz claim, with good results.
2	"500 Carats by Lunch"	December 14, 2015
The Cardwell family begin their mining season with a good start. Rich heads back to his topaz claim. Dwayne brings a new team up to assist him in looking for the second half of his "Royal" pocket. The Busse family begin a promising season.
3	"Mining in the Clouds"	December 21, 2015
The Dorris family head back to their Smoky Hawk claim, soon discovering a pocket of amazonite and smoky quartz combos. Brian is hindered by his injury from last season, but still leads to a great week for the Busse family. The Cardwell family discovers crystals left, right, and centre. Dwayne and crew hunt for a potential aquamarine pocket, with their efforts paying off.
4	"Cripple Creek Crystals"	December 28, 2015
The Dorris family strikes a pocket of amazonite early on. Amanda returns to a trashed camp, but that doesn't stop the crystals from flowing in. Rich investigates an unusual combination of crystals, deep within a mine shaft.
5	"Phantom Fluorite"	January 4, 2016
Rich returns to the Buck Tunnel Gold Mine, searching for a rare quartz crystal. Amanda and partner, Jessica, head up to Mt. White for the first time this season, making an arrangement to dig on another miners claim. The Dorris family moves to one of Tim's claims, hoping to find a fruitful mining site when the Smoky Hawk claim dries up. Dwayne's crew tunnels into an underground vault, only to have his spoils snatched away.
6	"Widow Maker"	January 11, 2016
Dwayne and crew focus on his caved in pocket, determined to get down to the aquamarine. The Dorris family come to the realisation that the Smoky Hawk claim is fully played out. Rich continues in his discovery of the rare quartz in the Buck Tunnel mine.
7	"Blue Moon Mining"	January 18, 2016
The prospectors work through the night under the light of a blue moon; the Busse family discovers their best aqua yet; the Cardwells open up an old pocket found by Craig's grandfather; and Rich is back at the Agnus Dei toiling for topaz.
8	"Colorado Kryptonite"	January 24, 2016
Rich sets upon his topaz claim with fresh determination after receiving some important information. The Cardwell's strike it lucky with a large pocket. Dwayne finishes up on 'The Blue Rose'.
9	"Ladies Love Aqua"	January 31, 2016
The Dorris family start production on a new claim, with promising results. Amanda and Jessica finish off the season on Mt. White with their largest aquamarine pocket to date. Rich finishes up on his topaz claim with a couple last minute finds.
10	"Thank You Rockhounds"	February 14, 2016
Everyone has some last minute digging to finalise their produce for the Denver mineral show, and receive some very good valuations.

== Permits ==
In August 2013, a hearing was held before the Colorado Mined Land Reclamation Board to address the issue of reclamation permits. Steve Brancato and Amanda Adkins appeared at the hearing. Brancato is fighting state permitting requirements. Adkins stated she didn't realize she needed the permit and agreed to file for one for her Last Laugh claim. Fretterd and Busse were also ordered to get reclamation permits, but reached an agreement with the state before the hearing.
