= BSG =

BSG may refer to:

== Places ==
- Bata Airport (IATA airport code: BSG), the second largest airport in Equatorial Guinea
- Besitang station (rail station code BSG), North Sumatra, Sumatra Island, Indonesia; see List of railway stations in Indonesia
- Bibliothèque Sainte-Geneviève, a library in Paris, France
- Bournemouth School for Girls, a grammar school located in Bournemouth, Dorset, England, UK
- British School of Guangzhou. Baiyun, Guangzhou, Guangdong, China

== Arts and entertainment ==
- Battlestar Galactica, an American science fiction franchise created by Glen A. Larson
  - Battlestar Galactica (1978 TV series), an American sci-fi television series
  - Battlestar Galactica (2004 TV series), a military sci-fi serial drama television series
- Beacon Street Girls, a tween book series by Annie Bryant
- Bering Sea Gold, a reality TV Alaska sea mining show
- Back Street Girls, a Japanese manga series by Jasmine Gyuh
- Birtles Shorrock Goble, an Australian pop/rock group
- Brendon Small's Galaktikon, the solo album debut by Brendon Small
- British Comedy Guide (formerly British Sitcom Guide), a website about British comedy

== Organizations ==
- Base Service Group, a type of unit of the Nigerian Air Force
- Bayswater Support Group, support group for gender-critical parents
- Naval Criminal Investigative Service Behavioral Science Group
- Betriebssportgemeinschaft, an organizational form of sports clubs in East Germany
- The Bharat Scouts and Guides, national scouting and guiding association of India
- Bharat Soka Gakkai, Indian wing of Soka Gakkai International
- British Society for Geomorphology, the professional organisation for British geomorphologists
- British Society of Gastroenterology, a British professional organisation of gastroenterologists and associates
- SUNY Brockport Student Government (BSG)
- Brotherhood of Saint Gregory, a community of friars within the Anglican communion
- Federal Social Court (German: Bundessozialgericht), the highest federal court in Germany for social security cases

== Other uses ==
- Basigin, a protein that in humans is encoded by the BSG gene
- Bashkardi language (ISO 639 language code: bsg)
- Bianca St-Georges (born 1997), Canadian soccer player
- Blue supergiant, supergiant stars of spectral type O or B
- Borosilicate glass, a type of glass with the main glass-forming constituents silica and boron oxide
- Brewers' spent grain
- Belt Starter Generator, for vehicles mild hybrid

== See also ==
- BGS (disambiguation)
- GBS (disambiguation)
- GSB (disambiguation)
- SBG (disambiguation)
- SGB (disambiguation)
