= Small Box Girder =

Tank deployed bridge used during WW2

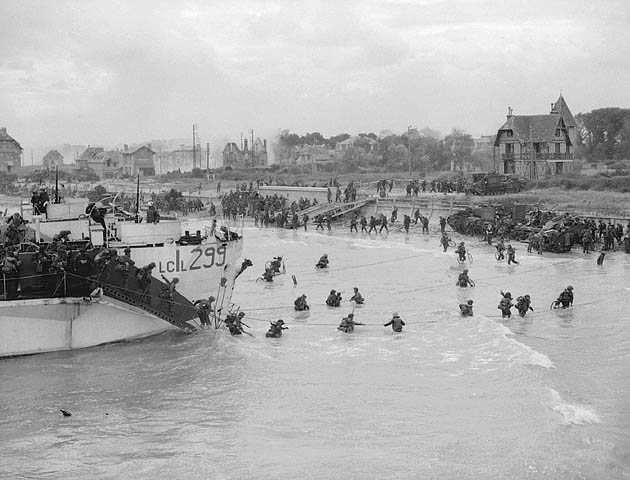
An SBG (used as ramp, centre) and Churchill AVRE (right) at 'Nan White' Beach at Bernières-sur-Mer during the Battle for Caen

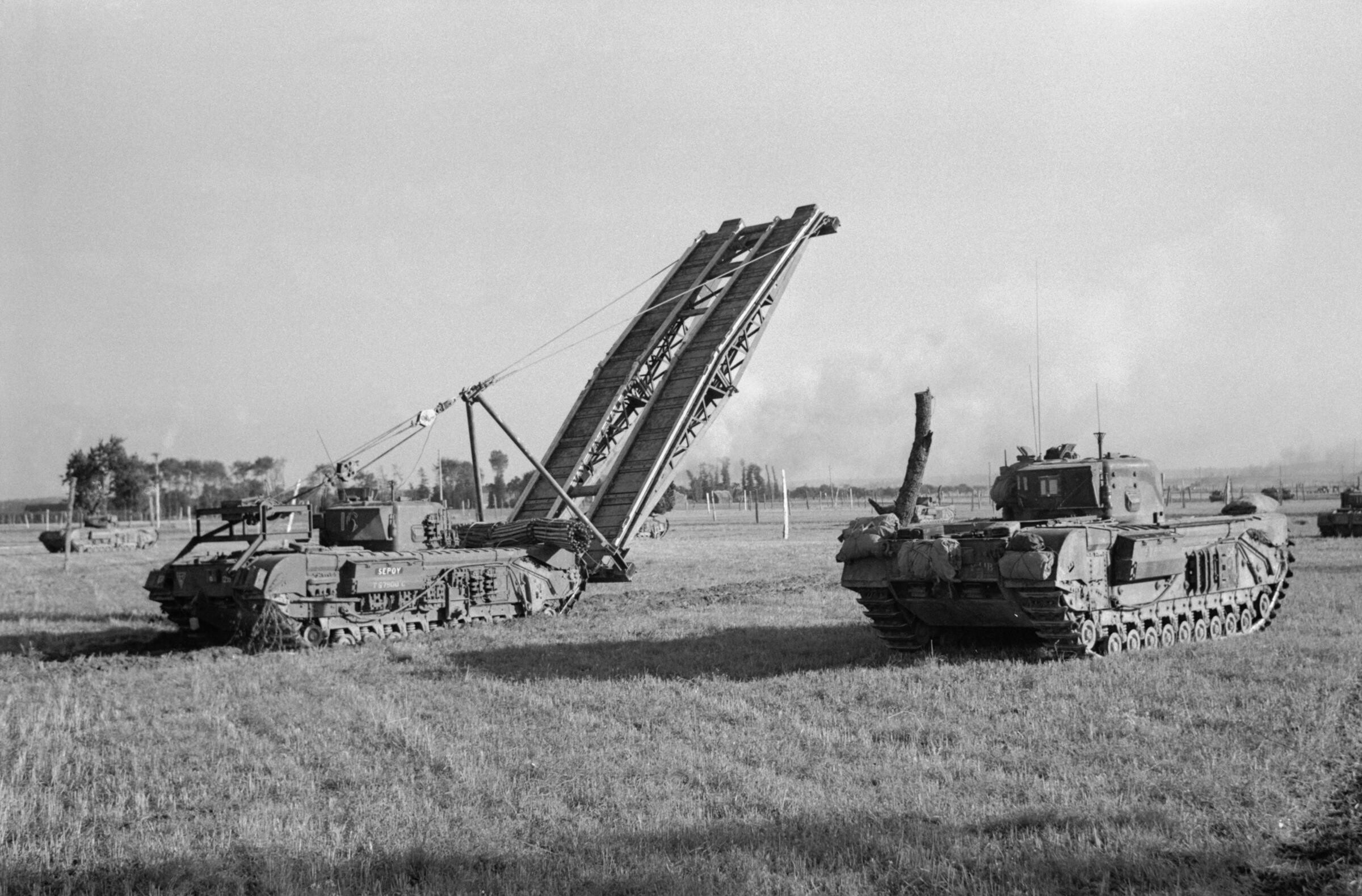
A Churchill AVRE with Small Box Girder Bridge and Churchill gun tank in 1945

The Small Box Girder bridge (SBG) was a small assault bridge that could be used to span gaps of up to 30 feet. It was typically carried on a tank, such as the Churchill Armoured Vehicle Royal Engineers (AVRE), and could be deployed without engineers having to expose themselves to enemy fire. The design had been formally adopted by the British Army in 1932. Pre-war the SBG had (more often than not without permission) quickly been copied by many countries around the world, including Germany. The German Army called their version of the SBG the Kastenträgergerät (K-Gerät for short). The United States was another country whose army created their own copy, designating it the H-20.

The SBG was used during the Normandy invasion of World War II (1944–5).

== See also ==
- Armoured vehicle-launched bridge
- Hobart's Funnies
- Box girder bridge
- M60 AVLB
- M104 Wolverine
- M1074 Joint Assault Bridge
