= MS-20 Daglezja =

Polish armoured vehicle-launched bridge

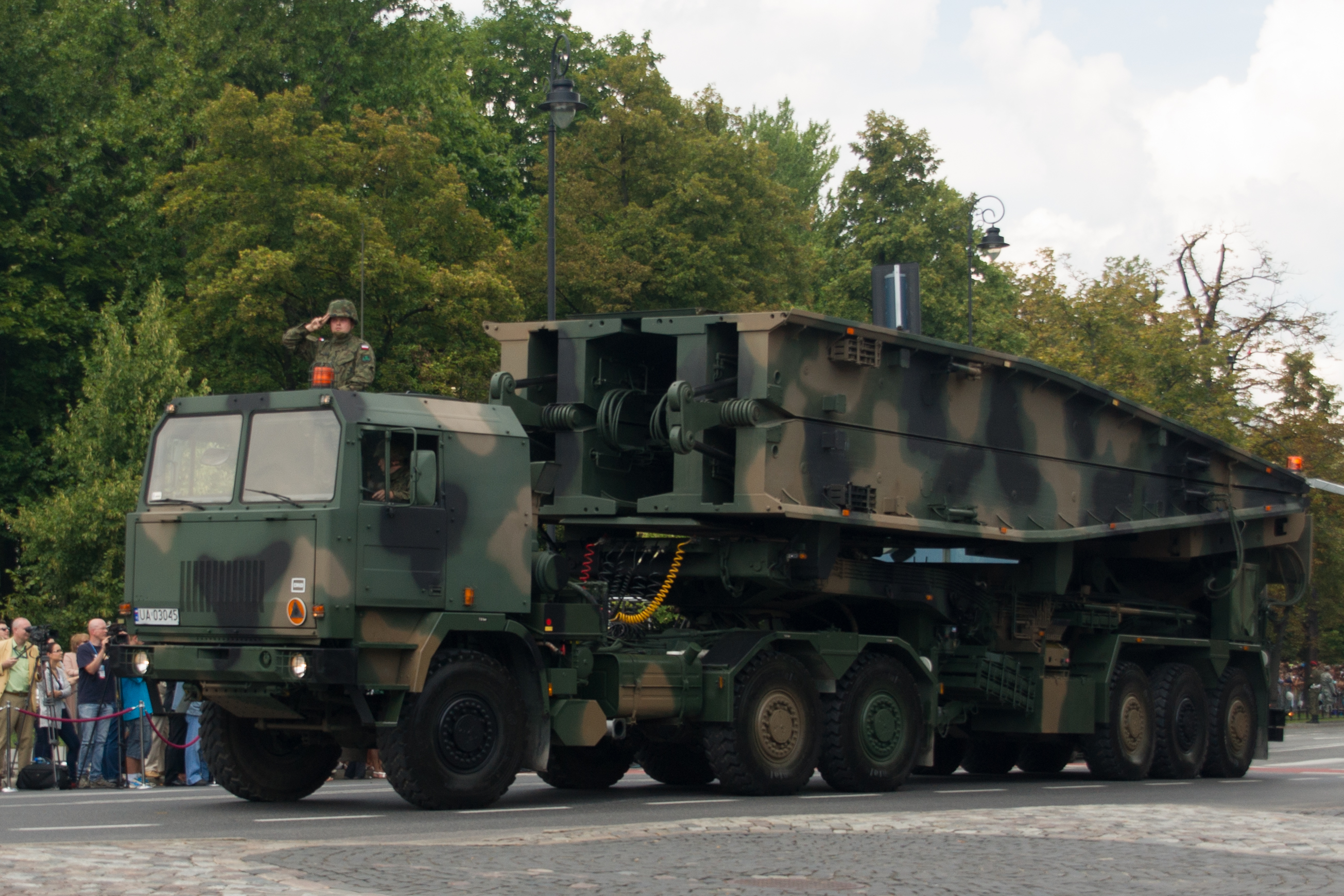
- MS-20 Daglezja at military parade in 2014.
- Type: Armoured vehicle-launched bridge
- Place of origin: Poland

Service history
- In service: 2012 – present
- Used by: See Operators

Production history
- Manufacturer: OBRUM
- No. built: 18
- Variants: MS-20 Daglezja, MG-20 Daglezja-G, MS-40 Daglezja

Specifications
- Length: 16,5 m
- Width: 2,55 m
- Height: 4 m

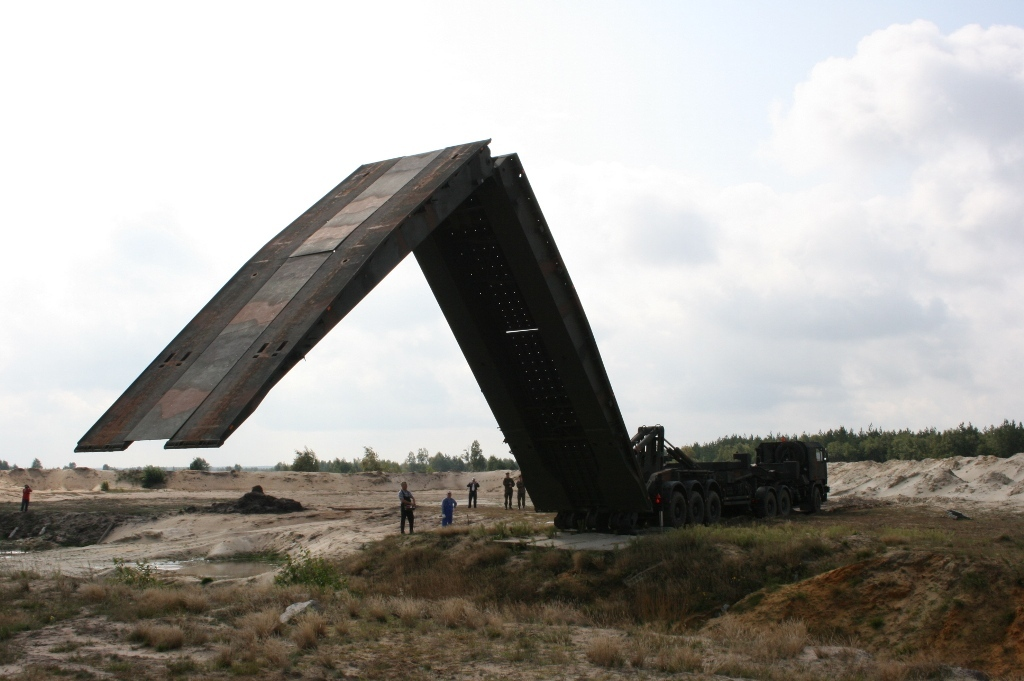
MS-20 bridge being deployed

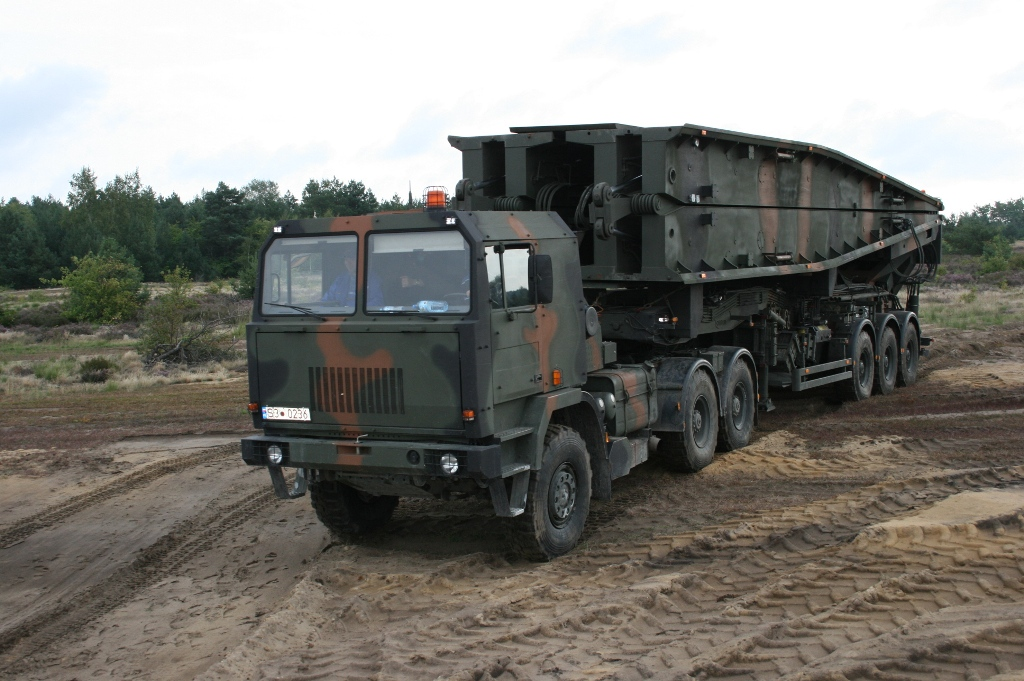
MS-20 Daglezja during exercise

The MS-20 Daglezja is a Polish armoured vehicle-launched bridge mounted on the Jelcz C662 wheeled chassis in service with the Polish Army since 2012.

== History ==
The Daglezja program began in 2002, at the request of the Department of Armament Policy of the Ministry of National Defense, OBRUM (Polish: Ośrodek Badawczo-Rozwojowy Urządzeń Mechanicznych – Research and Development Centre for Mechanical Appliances) began to develop tactical and technical assumptions for a modern automotive bridge set. Research and development work began in 2003, and in 2004 a bridge model and the first prototype were created (2005). Due to the failure to provide the quality and planned mass of the set the program was discontinued. Therefore, OBRUM made a second attempt to thoroughly rebuilt prototype from its own funds in 2008. After successfully passing the tests in 2010, the Department of Armament Policy of the Ministry of National Defense signed an agreement with OBRUM for the further work on the prototype, this culminated in the delivery of two vehicles to Polish army.

The first bridge was taken over on 20 November 2012 and sent to the Engineering and Chemical Troops Training Centre in Wrocław, and the second one was handed over on 10 December 2012. The second one was eventually delivered to the 2nd Engineer Battalion in Stargard the same year. After 2 prototypes were delivered, 10 series bridges were delivered in 2017.

Based on the accompanying bridge, a whole family of bridges is being built, including an assault bridge on the MG-20 Daglezja-G tracked chassis (on the T-72 tank chassis extended to 14 wheels), the MS-40 support bridge (enabling overcoming obstacles up to 40 m wide), and the Daglezja-P pontoon bridge. The prototype of the assault bridge was built in 2011. After tests, in 2018, the prototype was to be converted to a serial standard and a second copy was to be built.

== Construction details ==
MS-20 Daglezja is a companion bridge on a wheeled chassis. The entire set consists of: a Jelcz C662D.43-M tractor unit in a 6×6 configuration, a bridge semi-trailer, a bridge layer and the PM-20 span. The PM-20 span was made in such a way that its width can be changed, in the transport position it is 3 m, and in the working position 4 m. In addition, the span has fillings between the girders, enabling, for example, the passage of people and vehicles.

The bridge enables securing crossings or overcoming obstacles up to 20 m wide by tracked vehicles exerting a load of the MLC70 class (this corresponds to a vehicle weight of up to 63.5 tonnes) and wheeled vehicles or their combinations exerting a load of the MLC110 class (weight of up to 73 tonnes).

== Specifications ==
- span width:
  - 3 m (in transport condition)
  - 4 m (in working condition)
- span weight: 15 tons
- span length: 23 m (25.5 m – with access ramps)
- load capacity (according to STANAG 2021 standard):
  - 70MLC for tracked vehicles
  - 110MLC for wheeled vehicles

== Operators ==
Current Operators

- (Poland) Polish Land Forces (12): MS-20 Daglezja variant. (In October 2023 an order was placed for 43 MS-20 Daglezja-S, they will be delivered between 2025-2028).
- Vietnam People's Ground Forces (4) In 2021, as a result of a 2018 agreement, four MS-20 bridges modified to suit local conditions were delivered to the People's Army of Vietnam.

== See also ==
- M1074 Joint Assault Bridge System
- M104 Wolverine
- PP-64 Wstęga
- List of equipment of the Polish Land Forces

== Bibliography ==
- "Pierwsze mosty Daglezja w Wojsku Polskim". defence24.pl. Archived from the original on 2013-01-02.
- "DAGLEZJA". obrum.gliwice.pl. Archived from the original on 2012-04-25.
