= Armoured vehicle-launched bridge =

Military engineering vehicle

External videos
- Video of FV4205 Chieftain Armoured Vehicle-Launched Bridge (AVLB) showing an AVLB in action and the various steps of laying the bridge

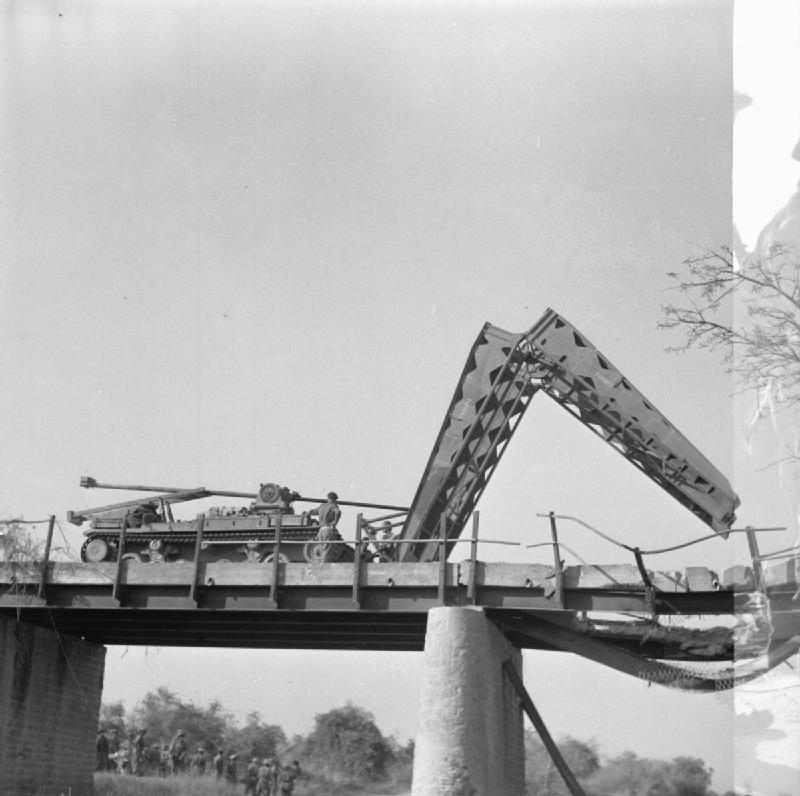
A Valentine bridgelayer of the 3rd Independent Bridge Building Company, Royal Armoured Corps, spans a damaged bridge near Meiktila, March 1945.

An armoured vehicle-launched bridge (AVLB), also known as a bridgelayer (especially for nonarmoured variants), or tank bridge, is a combat support vehicle, sometimes regarded as a subtype of military engineering vehicle, designed to assist militaries in rapidly deploying tanks and other armoured fighting vehicles across gap-type obstacles, such as rivers. The AVLB is usually a tracked vehicle converted from a tank chassis to carry a folding metal bridge instead of weapons. The AVLB's job is to allow armoured or infantry units to cross craters, anti-tank ditches, blown bridges, railroad cuts, canals, rivers and ravines. When a river too deep for vehicles to wade through is reached, and no bridge is conveniently located, or sufficiently sturdy, a substantial concern when moving 60+ ton tanks.

The bridge layer unfolds and launches its cargo, providing a ready-made bridge across the obstacle in only minutes. Once the span has been put in place, the AVLB vehicle detaches from the bridge, and moves aside to allow traffic to pass. Once all of the vehicles have crossed, it crosses the bridge itself and reattaches to the bridge on the other side. It then retracts the span ready to move off again. A similar procedure can be employed to allow crossings of small chasms or similar obstructions.

AVLBs can carry bridges of 19 metres (60 feet) or greater in length. By using a tank chassis, the bridge layer is able to cover the same terrain as main battle tanks. The provision of armour allows them to operate even in the face of enemy fire. However, this is not a universal attribute: some exceptionally sturdy 6×6 or 8×8 truck chassis have lent themselves to bridge-layer applications.

== Origins ==
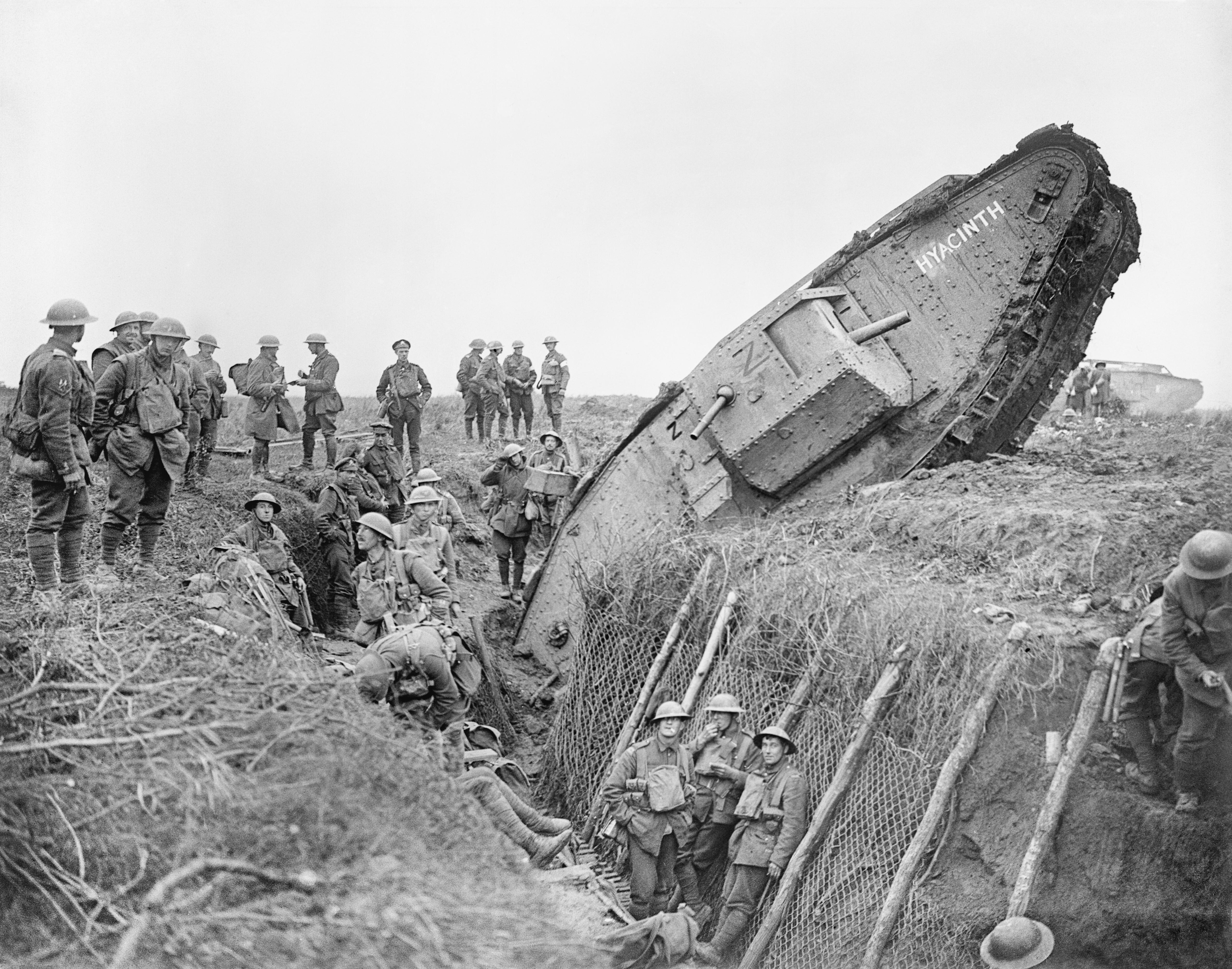
A British Mark IV tank at Cambrai.

The roots of the modern AVLB can be found in World War I, at the dawn of tank warfare. Having developed tanks, the United Kingdom and France were confronted with the problem of mounting tank advances in the face of the trenches that dominated the battlefields. Early engagements, such as at Cambrai demonstrated the tank's utility, but also highlighted its vulnerability to battlefield geography—many early tanks found themselves ignominiously stuck in the trenches, having insufficiently long tracks to cross them (as at right).

To counter this disadvantage, tanks, especially the common British Heavy tanks, began to go into battle with fascines, sometimes as simple as a bundle of heavy sticks, carried on top. By dropping these into the trenches, they were able to create a wedge over which the tank could drive. Later, some tanks began to carry rails on their decks—the first AVLBs.

By 1919, the British Army had, at its training centre in Christchurch, a Mark V** tank with lifting gear able to carry and place a bridge or carry out mine clearing and demolition.

== World War II and subsequent use ==
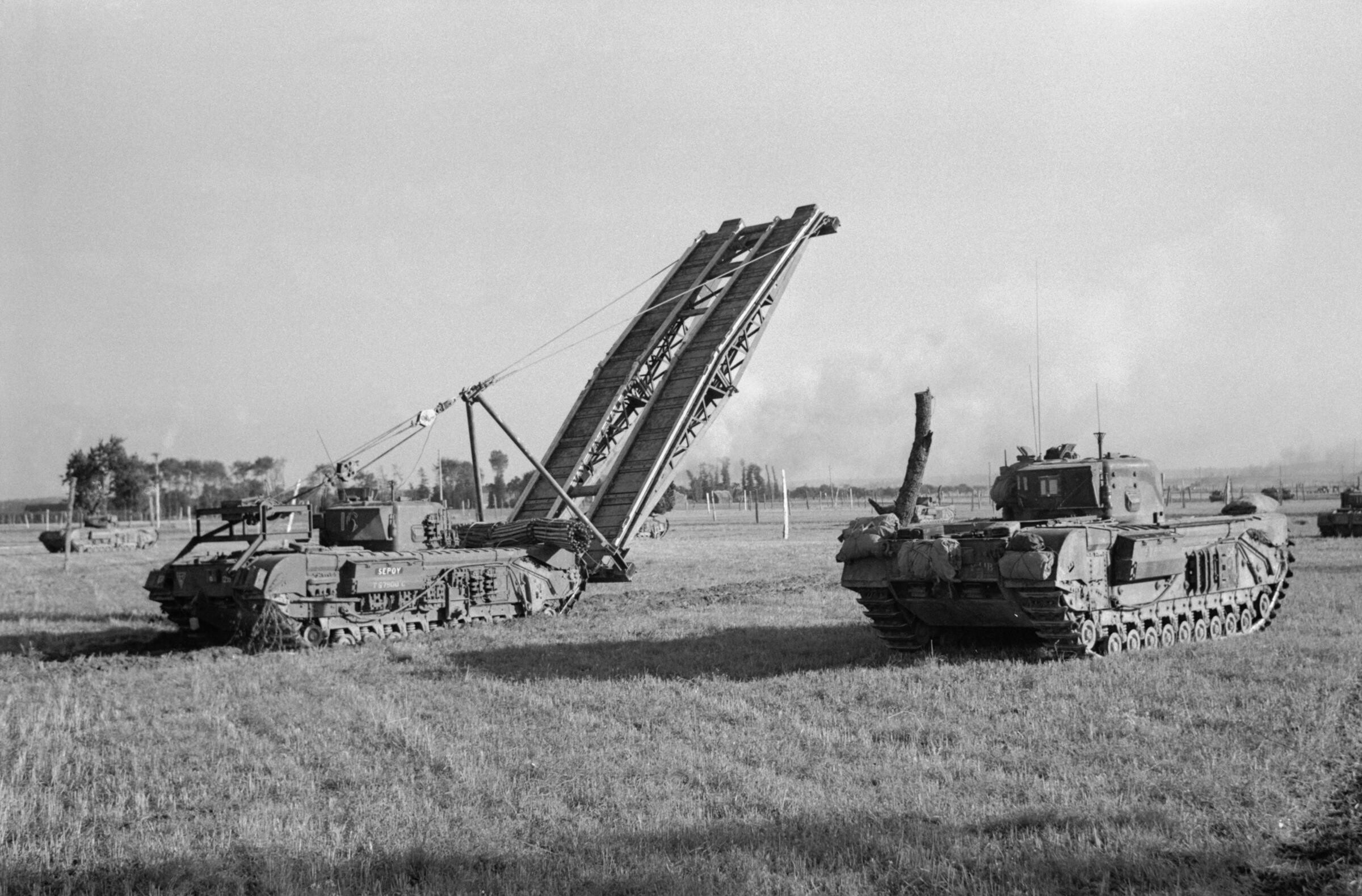
A Churchill AVRE with Small Box Girder Bridge and Churchill Crocodile flame-throwing tank in 1945

It was in the World War II era that the importance of armoured bridge layers, as well as combat engineering vehicles and armoured recovery vehicles, became fully clear. With the advent of Blitzkrieg warfare, whole divisions had to advance along with tanks, which were suddenly far out-pacing the speed of infantry soldiers. Besides leading to the advent of self-propelled artillery/assault guns, mobile anti-aircraft and armoured personnel carriers/cars, it became clear that functions like vehicle repair, mine-clearing, and the like would have to be carried out by armoured vehicles advancing along with tanks.

These forces would have to be able to cross all forms of terrain without losing speed, and without having to concentrate their thrusts over certain bridges. The rising weight of armoured vehicles meant that fewer bridges could support these massed crossings. The only feasible solution to the dilemma posed by the mobility of all-mechanised armed forces was a dedicated platform that could improvise river and obstacle crossings at short notice and in inconvenient locations. Tracked and armoured, it was capable of operating alongside combat units, crossing rough terrain and advancing in the face of light fire. To maximize on common parts and ease maintenance complications, they were usually based on existing tank chassis.

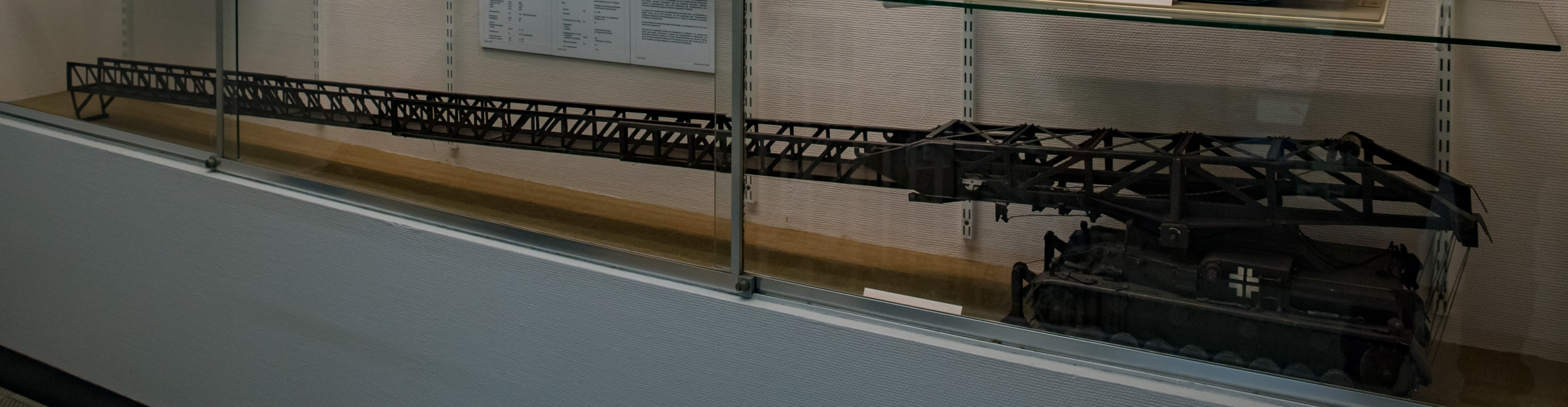
infantry assault ladder on Panzer IV chassis

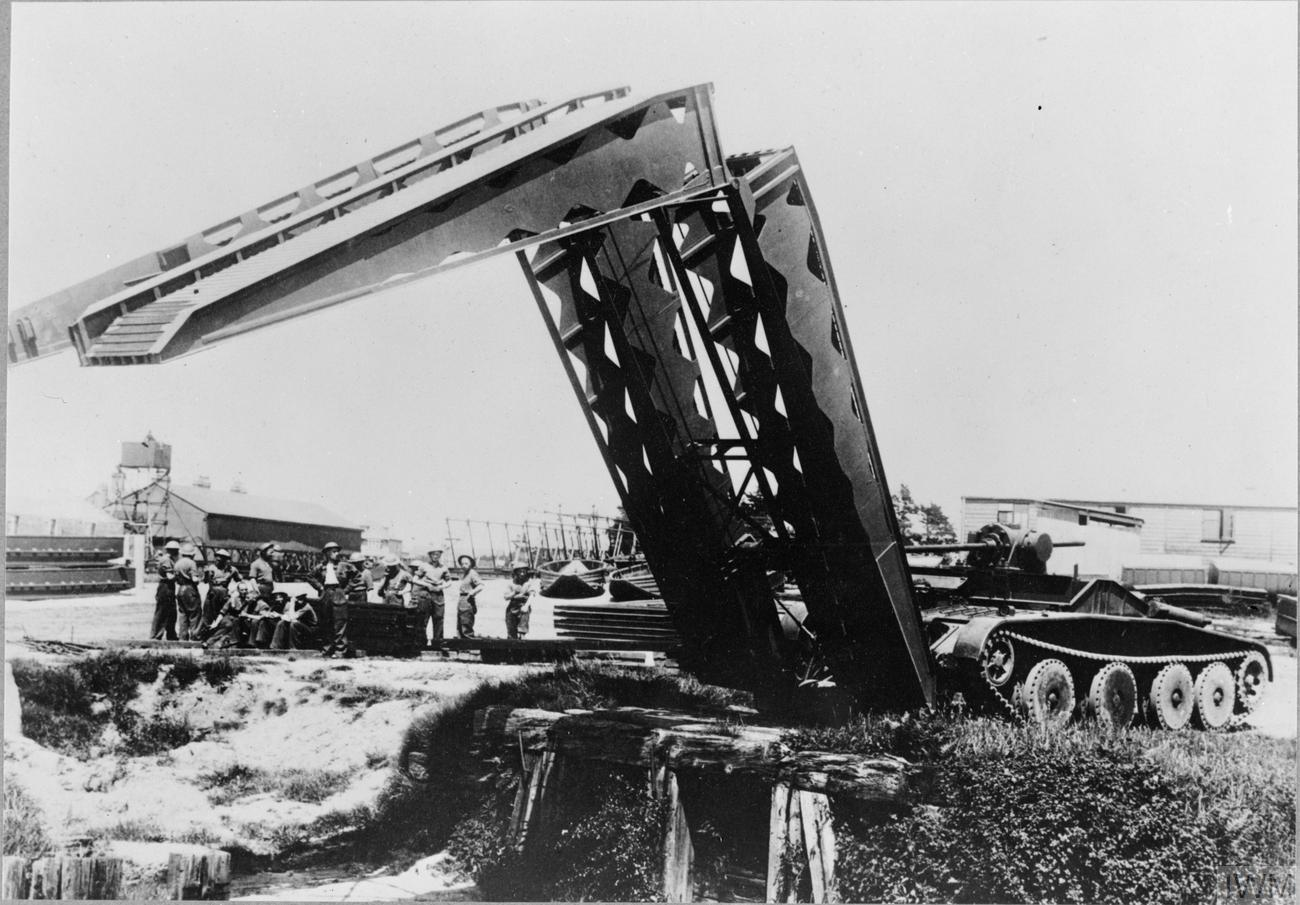
Circa 1943, a Covenanter deploys its bridge.

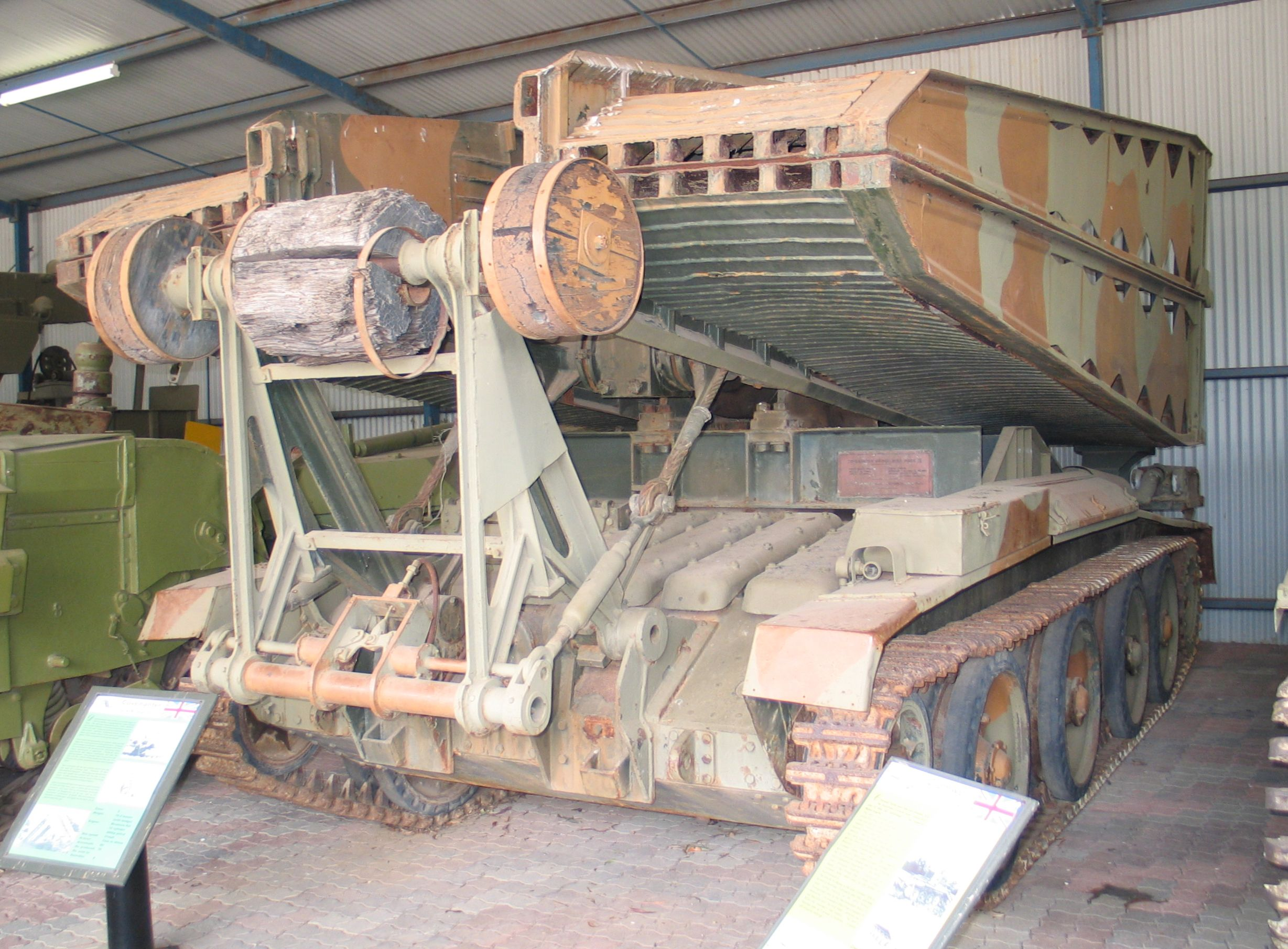
Circa 2007, a Covenanter tank bridgelayer with bridge folded

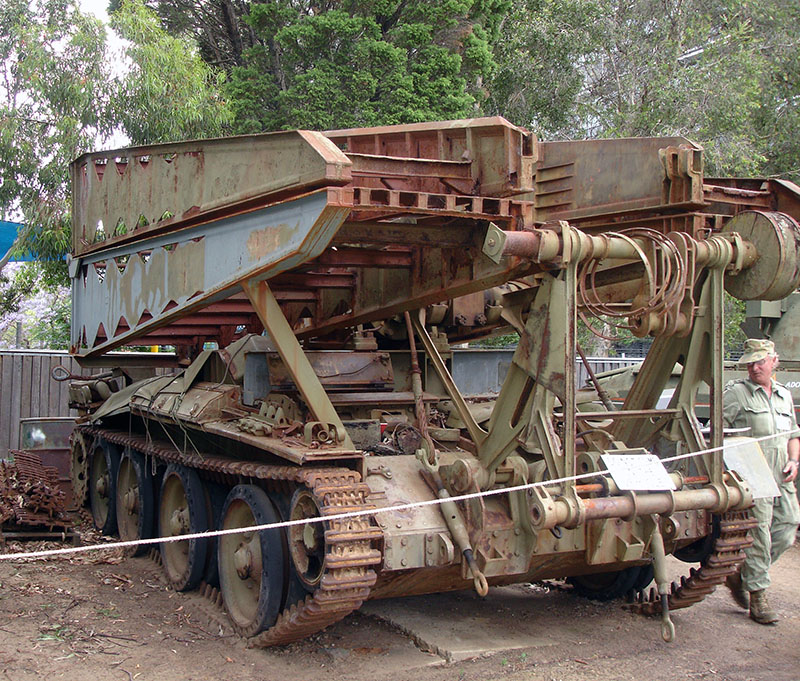
Circa 2008, a Covenanter tank bridgelayer at the 1/15th Royal NSW Lancers awaiting restoration.

The Covenanter tank bridge-layer

One of the earliest series-produced examples is the Brückenleger IV, a German AVLB based on the Panzer IV, which entered service with the Wehrmacht in 1940. Twenty were built, but problems of excessive weight limited the vehicle's effectiveness, and eventually all 20 were converted back to tanks. A second type was a infantry assault ladder on Panzer IV chassis of which only two were built.

A new scissors bridge design was brought out by the British in response to the war, sufficient to support a 24-ton load over 30 ft (9.1 m). This was developed for the Covenanter tank. It developed into a 30-ton capacity and was carried by a turretless Valentine tank. It was used in Italy, North West Europe and Burma.

The Allies developed similar equipment, mostly based on the ubiquitous Churchill infantry tank carrying the Small Box Girder, and the Sherman medium tank of the British and U.S. armies, respectively. In some early designs, bridge-layers could emplace bridges, but not retract them. Other vehicles were integral to the bridge themselves, such as the Churchill Ark, wading to the middle of a river or driving up against an obstacle and extending simple ramps in both directions. Following vehicles would drive directly over the bridge layer.

== Modern ==
Most modern bridge layers are based on a main battle tank chassis. An example of a modern main battle tank (MBT) chassis being converted to a bridgelayer is the creation of the M104 Wolverine Armored Bridgelayer. Based on a modified M1A2 SEP MBT chassis, the Wolverine replaces the MBT turret with a bridge fitted atop the chassis.

The bridge atop the M104 Wolverine measures 26m in length, and takes just 4 minutes to place across an obstacle securely. The bridge is built to be able to withstand countless crossings of vehicles as heavy as the M1A2 Abrams, which weighs around 70 tonnes. Another approach to bridge laying across water is the use of amphibious vehicles, which act as combination of pontoon and roadway. These enter the water and join to form a bridge. An example is the German M3 Amphibious Rig, a bridging vehicle used by Germany, the UK, Singapore, and Taiwan.

Notable AVLBs in service

- India: DRDO Sarvatra Sarvatra is a truck-mounted, multi-span, mobile bridging system.
- India: T-72 Bridge Layered Tank, Bridge-Laying system mounted on T-72 tank.
- France: SPRAT système de pose rapide de travures PTA2, based on an 8x8 truck chassis
- Germany: Biber based on the Leopard 1 tank chassis and is used by most Leopard 1 users.
- Germany: Panzerschnellbrücke 2, based on the Leopard 2 Chassis. No production orders.
- Germany: Panzerschnellbrücke Leguan: This modular system combines a bridge module created by MAN Mobile Bridges GmbH with a tank chassis. The Bundeswehr is testing the Leguan on Leopard 2 chassis.
- China: GQC-003, based on Type 08 IFV
- Japan: Type 67 AVLB, based on Type 61 MBT.
- Japan: Type 91 AVLB, based on Type 74 MBT and Type 87 SPAAG.
- Poland: MS-20 Daglezja mounted on the Jelcz C662 wheeled chassis
- Russia: MTU-72 AVLB, based on the T-72 MBT
- Russia: MT-55, based on the T-55 medium tank
- United Kingdom: Titan Armoured Vehicle Launcher Bridge, based on the Challenger 2 MBT. Replaces ChAVLB, the Chieftain tank-based AVLB.
- Canada: Beaver armoured bridgelayer vehicle based on the Leopard 1
- United States: M60A1 AVLB, based on the M60 MBT; now supplanted by the M104 Wolverine and M1074 Joint Assault Bridge, based on the M1 Abrams MBT
- Saudi Arabia: AMX-30 Bridge, based on the French AMX-30.
- Turkey: SYHK, an amphibious bridging vehicle based on the FNSS Pars.
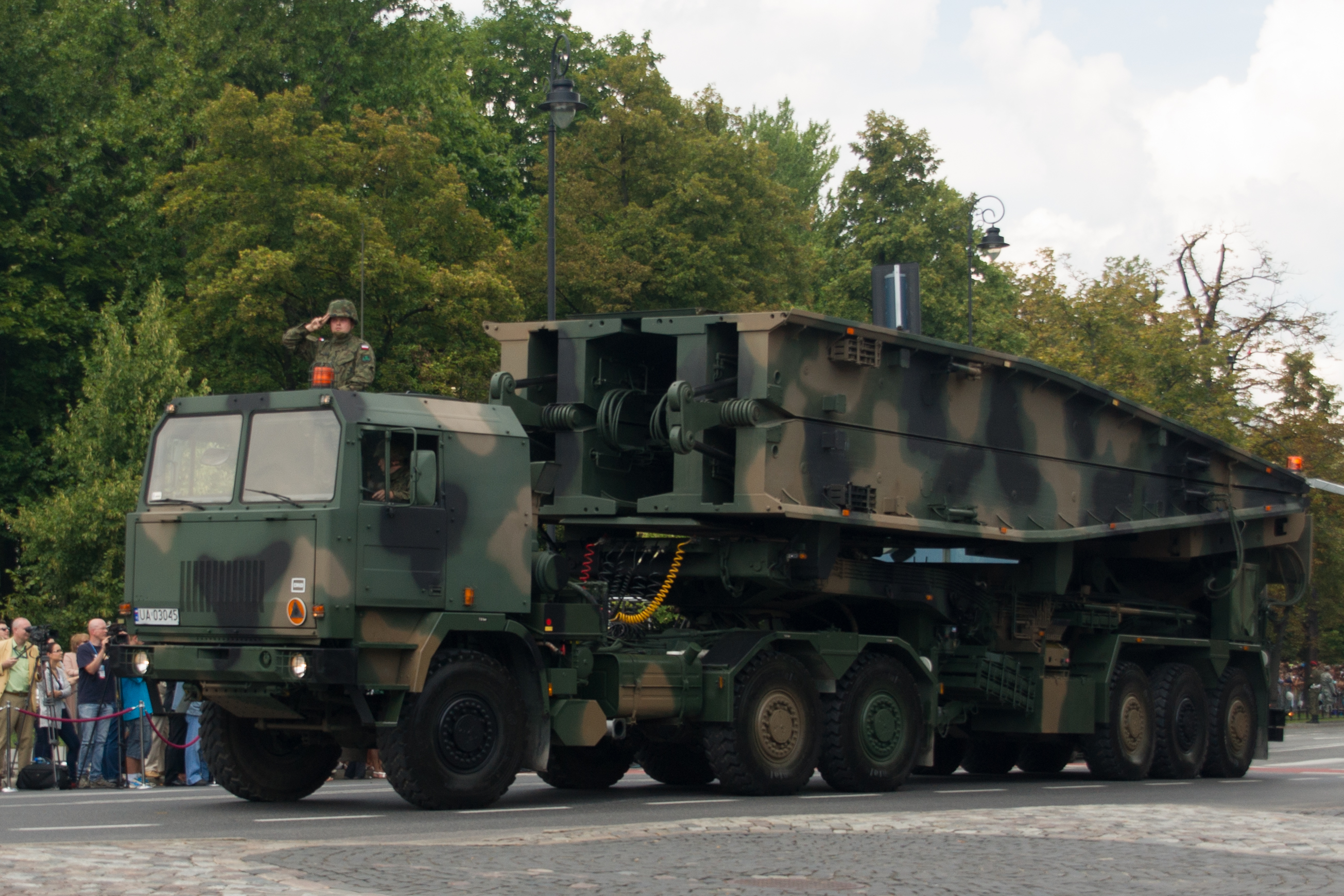
Polish MS-20 Daglezja mounted on the Jelcz C662 wheeled chassis in service with the Polish Army

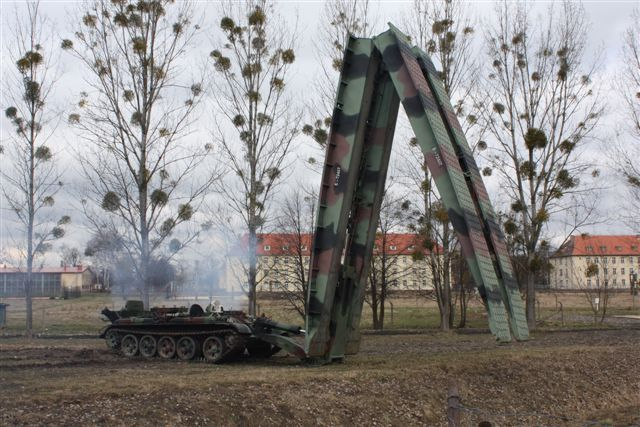
Polish BLG-67M

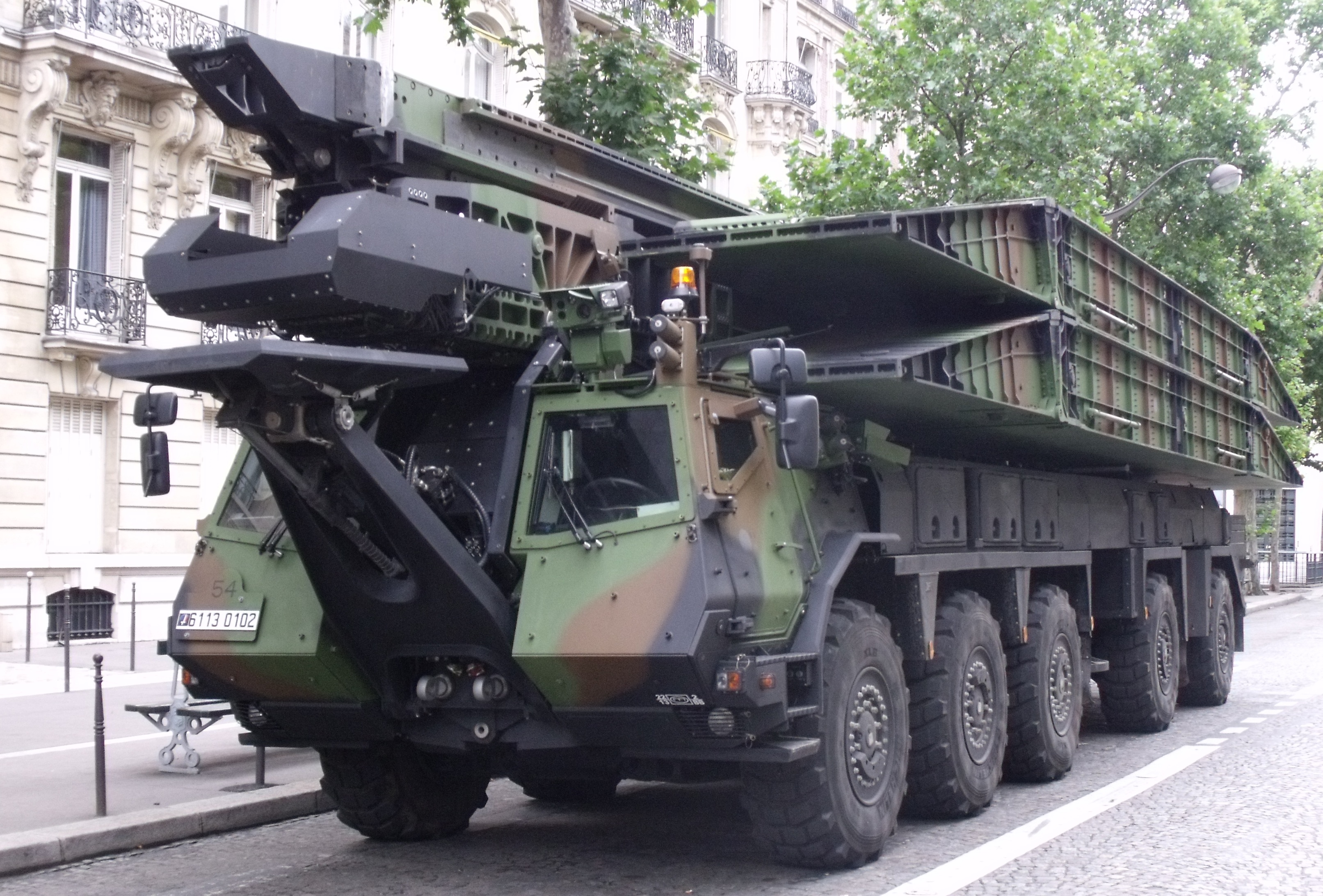
French SPRAT

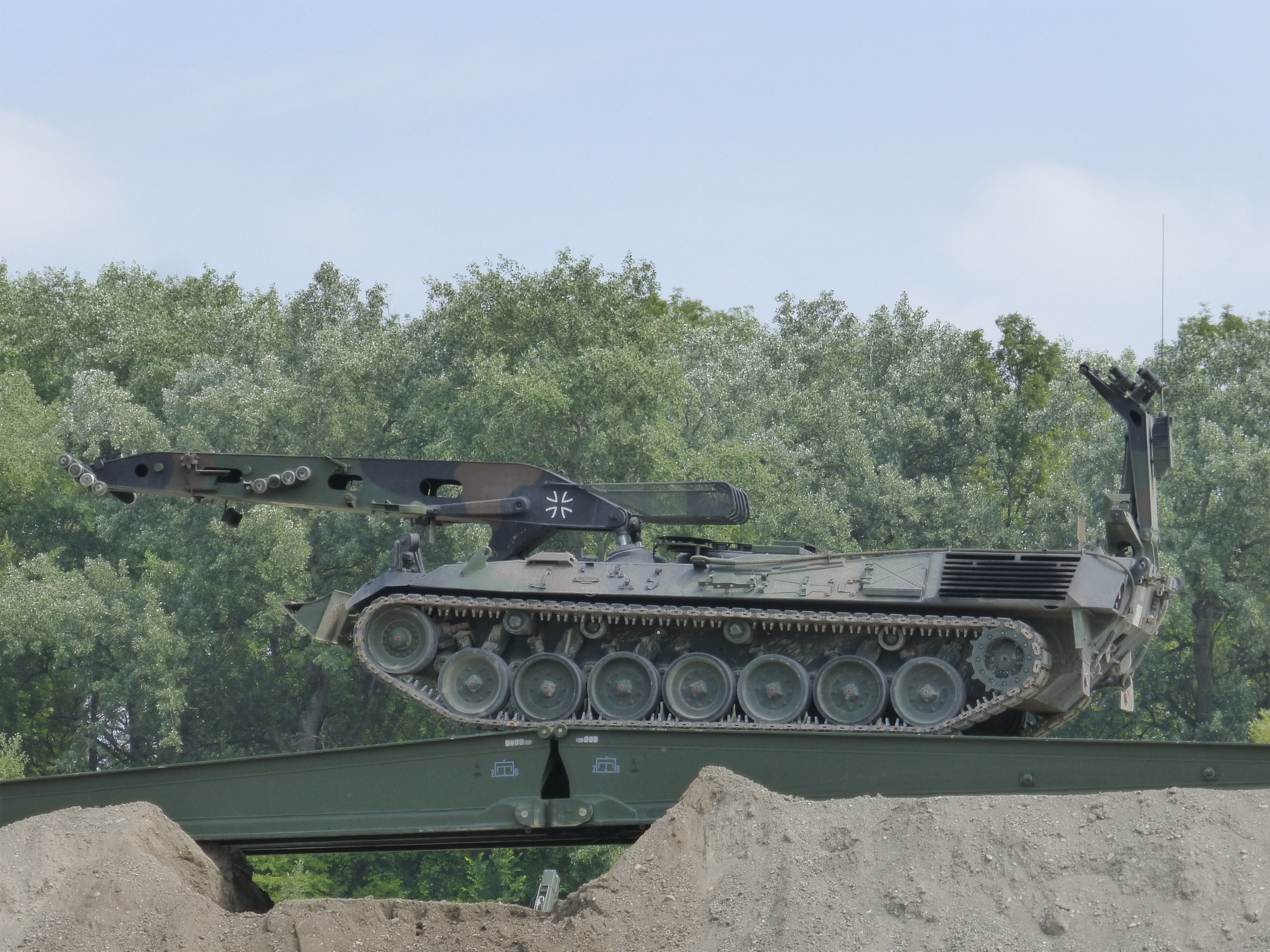
A Biber of the German Army using its own bridge

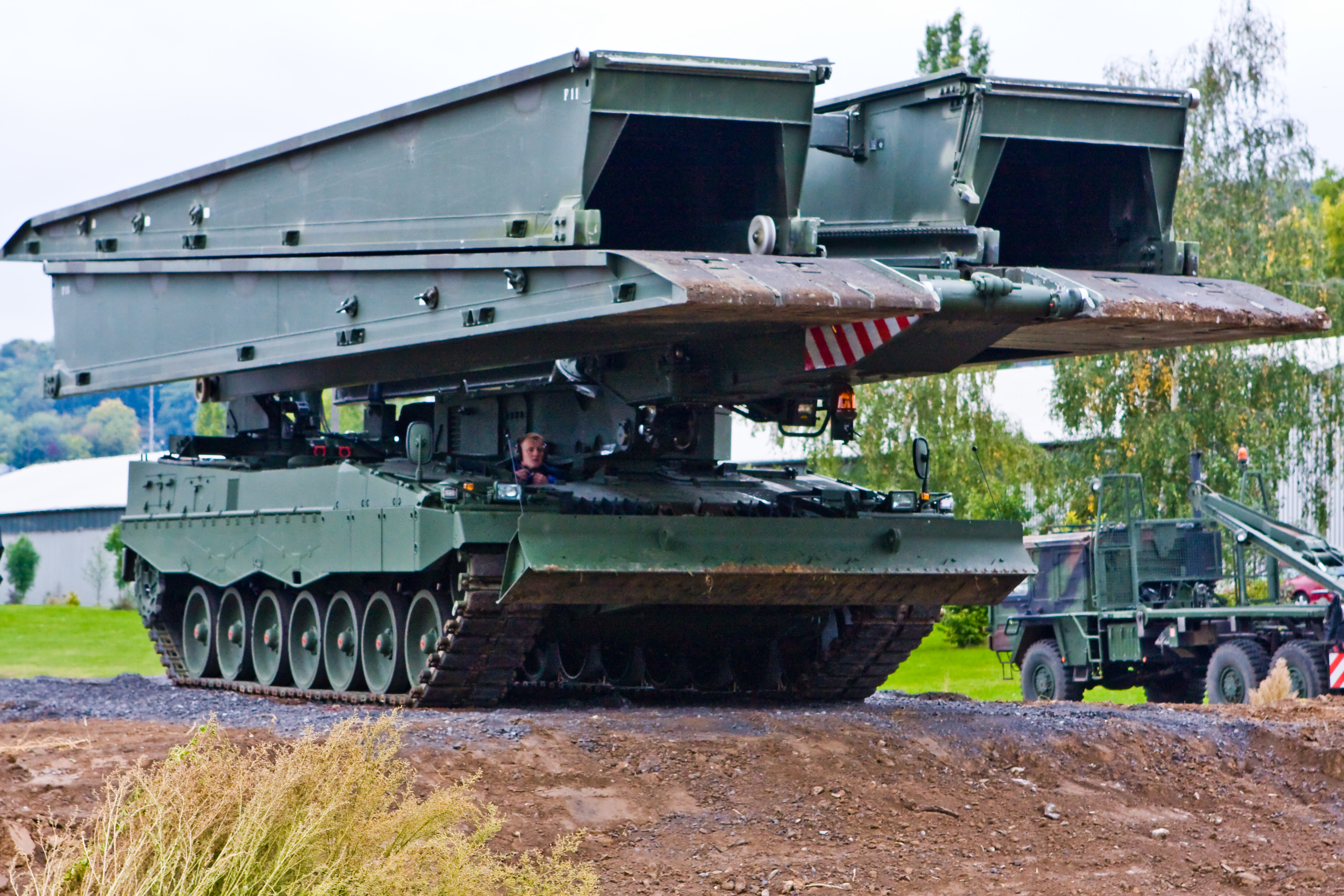
Leguan-prototype with bridge of the German Army

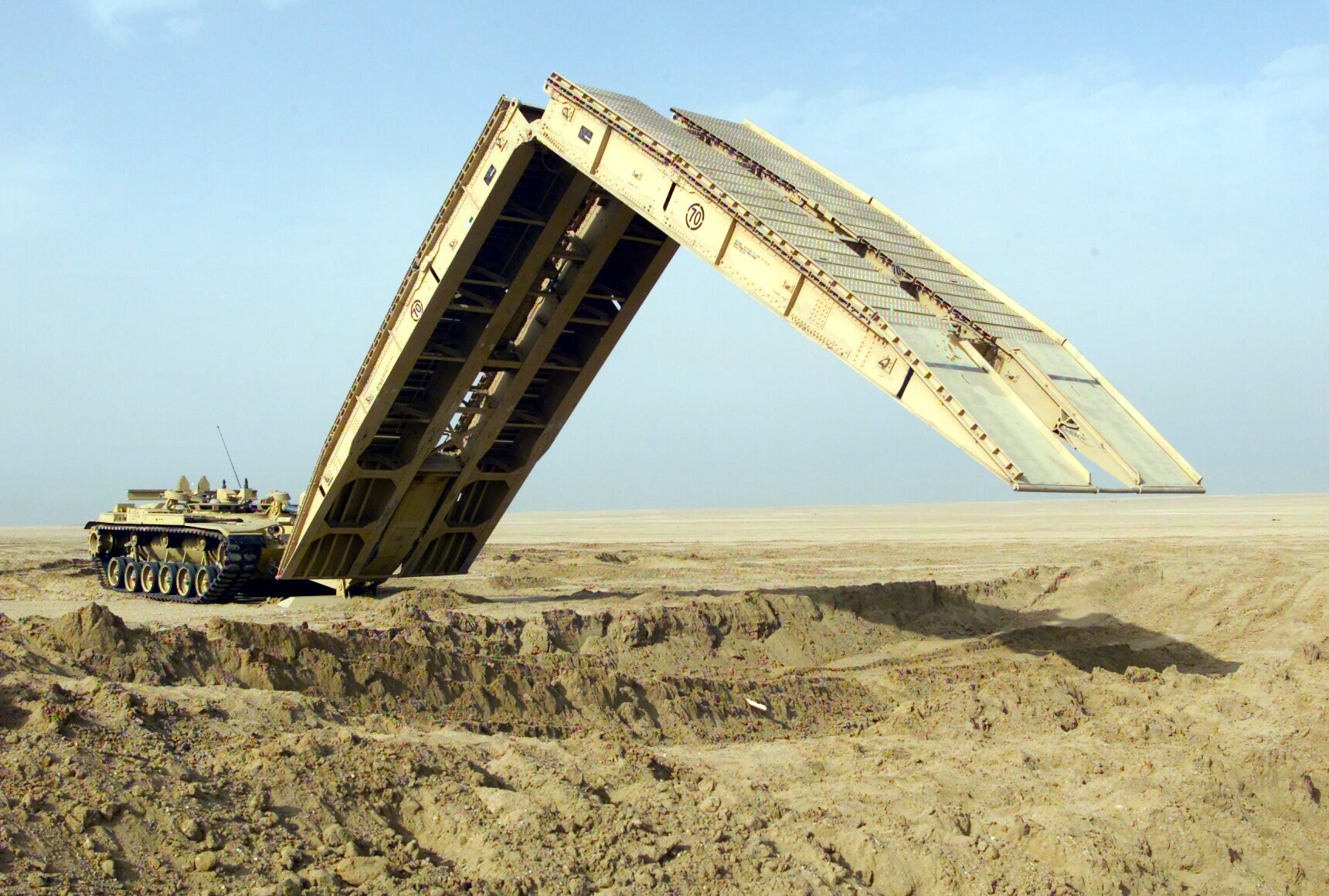
An M60A1 Armored Vehicle Launched Bridge, deploying its scissors-type bridge.

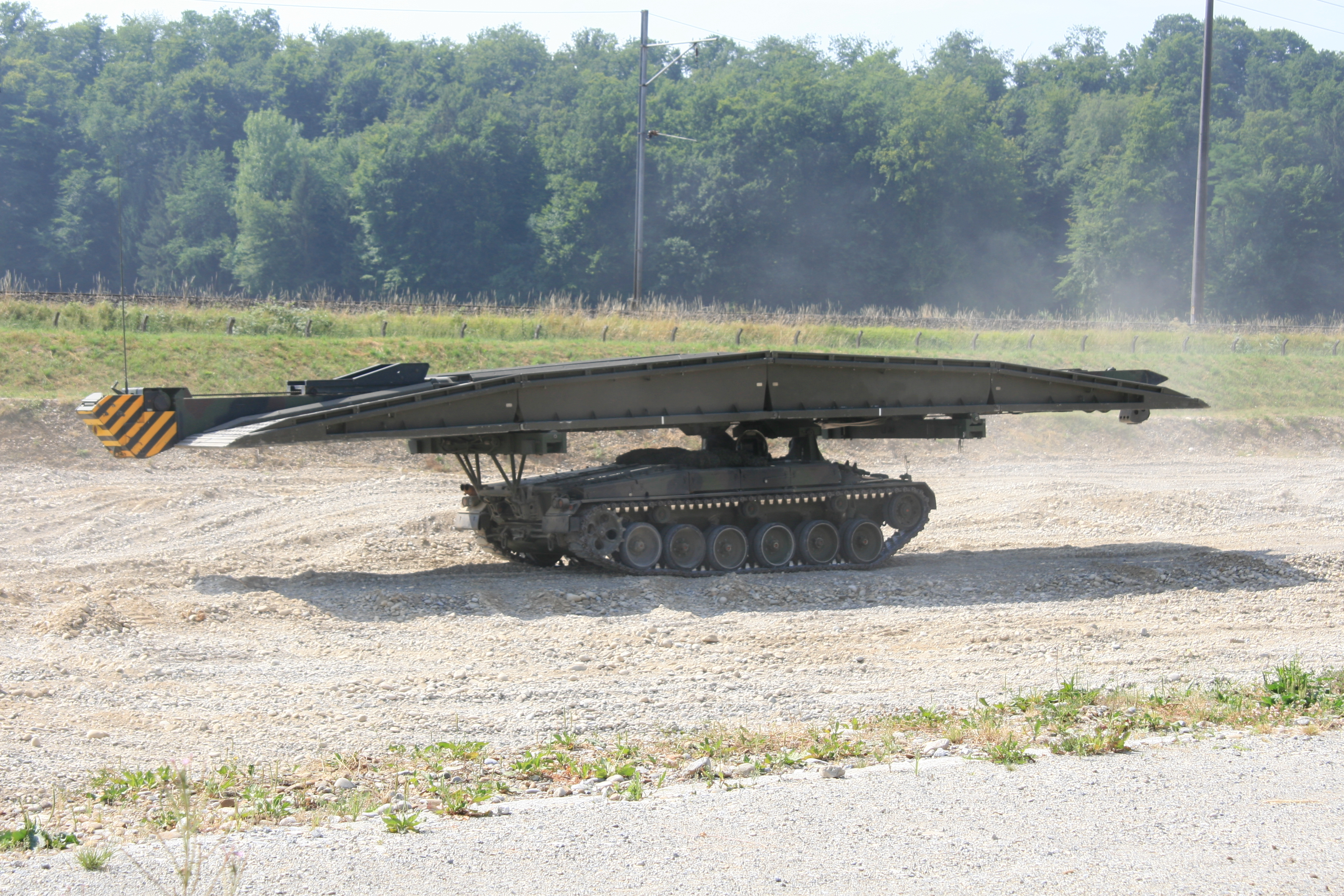
Brückenpanzer 68 of the Swiss Armed Forces

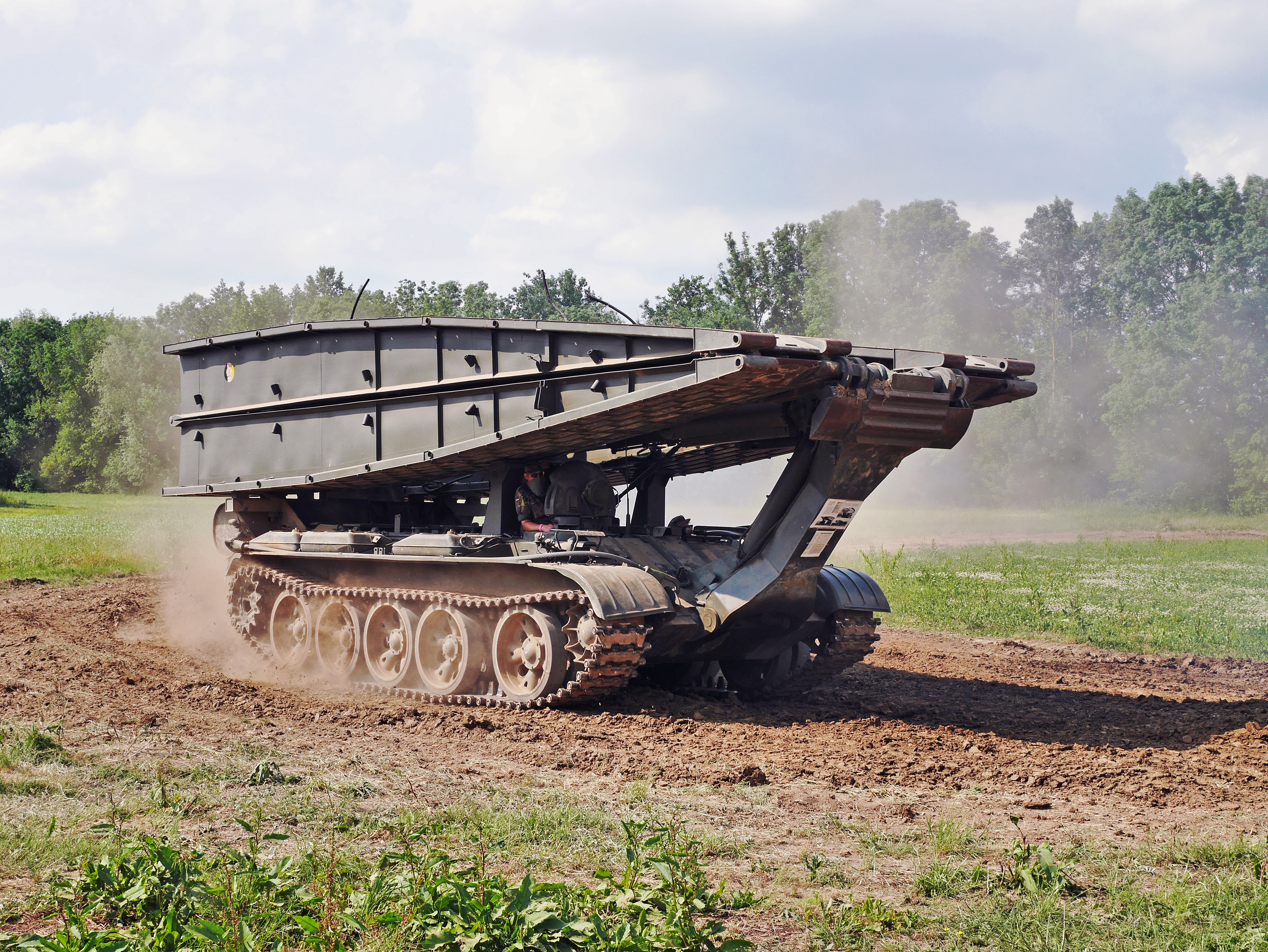
MT-55

== See also ==
- Kartik BLT
- AM 50 automatically launched assault bridge
- Bailey bridge
- Callender-Hamilton bridge
- Mabey Logistic Support Bridge
- Medium Girder Bridge
- Military engineer
- Pontoon bridge
