= Bsg episodes =

bsg episodes may refer to:

- List of Battlestar Galactica (2004 TV series) episodes
- List of Battlestar Galactica (1978 TV series) and Galactica 1980 episodes
- List of Bering Sea Gold episodes

== See also ==
- BSG (disambiguation)
