= M3 Amphibious Rig =

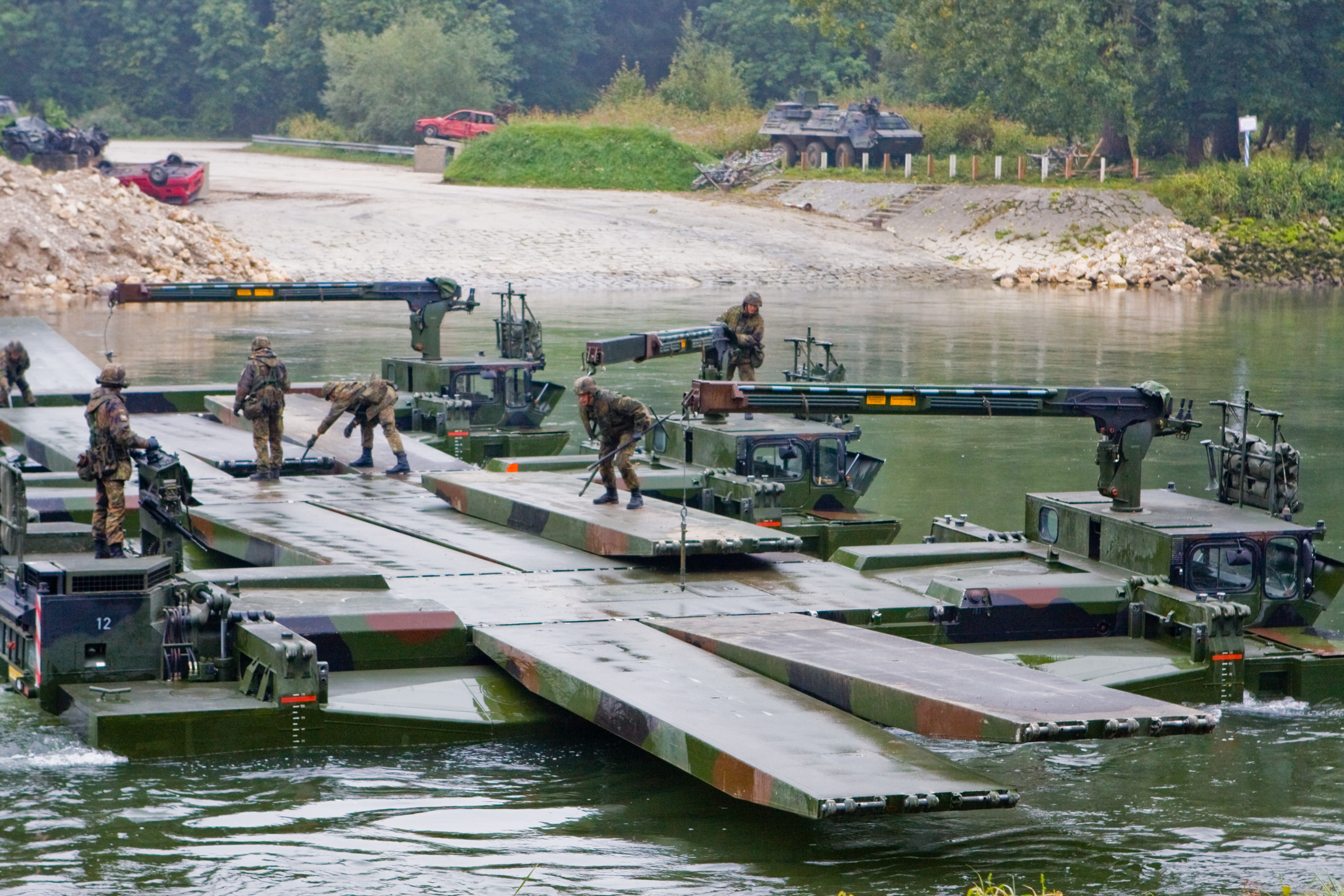
- M3 of the German Army
- Type: Amphibious bridging vehicle
- Place of origin: Germany

Service history
- In service: 1999
- Used by: See Operators
- Wars: 2003 invasion of Iraq

Production history
- Designer: Eisenwerke Kaiserslautern (now General Dynamics European Land Combat Systems)
- Designed: 1982–1990s
- Manufacturer: General Dynamics European Land Combat Systems
- Produced: 1994–present

Specifications
- Mass: approx. 28 tonnes (62,000 lb)
- Length: 13.03 m (513 in)
- Width: 3.35 m (132 in) with side pontoons folded, 6.57 m (259 in) with side pontoons unfolded
- Height: 3.97 m (156 in)
- Crew: 2–3
- Engine: Diesel; 298 kW (400 hp)
- Operational range: 750 km (470 mi) on internal fuel, over land
- Maximum speed: 80 km/h (50 mph) on land, 14 km/h (8.7 mph) in water

The M3 Amphibious Rig is a self-propelled, amphibious bridging vehicle and ferrying vehicle that is used for the transportation of tanks and other vehicles across water obstacles.

== Development and service ==
=== M3 ===
Originally developed by the German firm Eisenwerke Kaiserslautern (EWK, since 2002 acquired by General Dynamics European Land Systems), it succeeded the conceptually similar M2 made by the same company. Like its predecessor, the M3 traverses roads on its four wheels, deploying two large aluminium pontoons for buoyancy on water.

The M3 is 1.4 metres (4.6 ft) longer and 3,300 kg (7,300 lb) heavier than the M2, with the M3 having a turn diameter of 24 metres (79 ft).

Development of the M3 began in 1982, with the final prototype being delivered 10 years later in 1992. A first order of 64 serial vehicles was made in 1994, and it entered service with the German and British armies in 1996. Since then, the M3 has also been adopted by several NATO and allied nations.

=== M3 EVO ===
The German Army selected the M3 EVO as part of the Schwimmschnellbrücke 2 (SSB 2) programme to replace the M3 in service. The development starts in 2025, the Critical Design Review is scheduled for March 2027. The prototype is expected for 2029, and the serial production to start in 2029, with the final delivery for Germany in 2036.

== Operating concept ==
The M3 is self-deployable by road, operating as a 4x4 wheeled vehicle with a maximum road speed of 80 kilometres per hour (50 mph). For amphibious operation, two large aluminium pontoons are deployed, unfolding them along the length of its hull. The crew exits the vehicle cab to maneuver the pontoon using controls located on top of the hull. In water, the M3 is propelled at speeds of up to 14 km/h (8.7 mph) by two pump jets that can be steered in 360-degrees.

Multiple rigs can be joined together using long ramps, three of which are carried on each vehicle, to form a bridge or a ferry that can be used to cross a water obstacle. Eight M3 Rigs can be used to create a 100-metre-long (330 ft) bridge which can be traversed by vehicles up to and including the heaviest 60-tonne (130,000 lb) main battle tank like the Leopard 2A6 and Challenger 2. Alternatively, just two M3 Rigs may be joined to create a ferry capable of carrying a similar load across much wider water gaps.

== Combat history ==
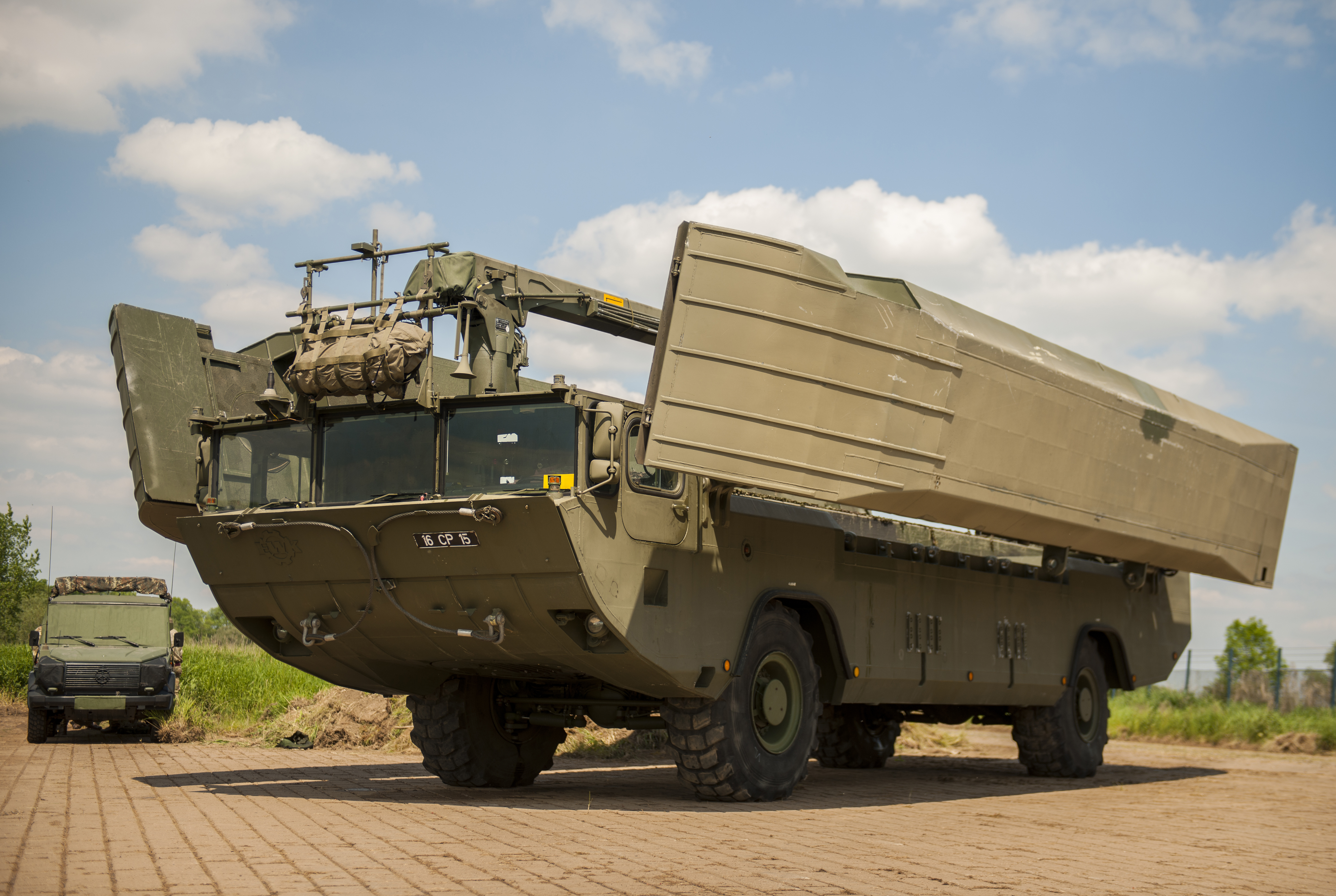
British M3 Amphibious Rig in Minden, Germany during a joint UK/German Bridging Operation.

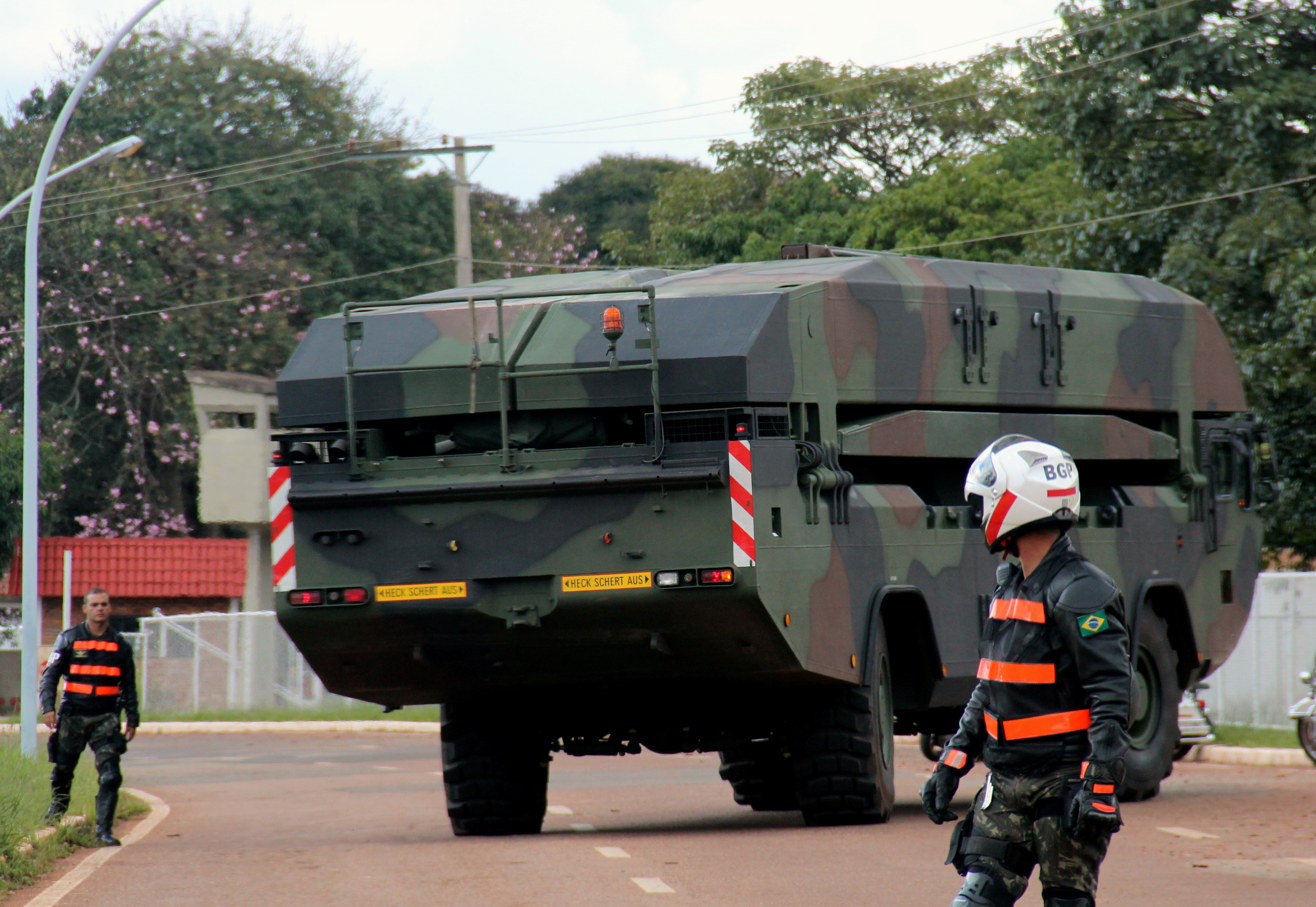
Brazilian M3 Amphibious Rig

=== Operation Telic ===
The M3 Amphibious Bridging Vehicle saw its first combat actions in Operation Telic, Britain's military operations in the Iraq War (until withdrawal in 2011). From 25 March 2003, 23 Amphibious Engineer Squadron, of 28 Engineer Regiment of the Royal Engineers ferried elements of 3 Commando Brigade across the Shatt Al-Basrah waterway, enabling their continued advance on the Iraqi city of Basra. A subsequent riverine crossing at the Rumaila oil fields was also undertaken by the M3. This action transported three AS90 self-propelled howitzers in support of 16 Air Assault Brigade of the British Army.

== Operators ==
=== Current operators ===
==== M3 system ====
Germany (30) and United Kingdom (10)
Germany and the UK both ordered a batch of 64 M3 in 1994.
Both the British Army and the German Army operate together 40 M3 systems in the German-British Engineer Bridge Battalion 130 in Minden.
Indonesia (18)
Indonesian Army: 18 ordered in 2016, confirmed in 2017, the first were received in 2020.
Latvia (4 +2 on order)
Latvian Army: ordered in 2021 through a US funding (USD $22 million), it entered service in 2025.
Two more funded by the USA to be delivered in 2026.
Singapore
Singapore Army: the M3G entered service in 2007, the quantity hasn't been unveiled.
South Korea (110)
South Korean Army: ordered in 2021, the deliveries started in 2024, to continue until 2027. It's produced under licence by Hanwha defence.
Sweden (34)
Swedish Army: it is known in Sweden as the "Amfibiebro 400".
Orders:
- July 2022, 12 ordered with options for additional systems.
- Second batch of 4 Amfibiebro 400 ordered.
- March 2024, 9 ordered.
- September 2024, 9 more ordered, deliveries planned for 2025 - 2027.
Deliveries:
- the first was handed over in November 2024.
Taiwan
Republic of China Army: the M3G is in service in the armed forces, but the quantity is unknown.
Ukraine (6)
The Netherlands supplied 6 M3 systems. This aid was announced in March 2023.

=== Future operators ===
==== M3 system ====
Denmark
Royal Danish Army: ordered by the DALO in September 2025, to enter service in 2028.
Spain
Spanish Army: ordered in May 2025, with deliveries from 2026 to 2029. The budget approved is of €85 million.
Norway
Norwegian Army: Contract signed in November 2025, with deliveries from fall 2026 to 2028. The budget approved is of ca. €102 million.

==== M3 EVO ====
Germany (66)
German Army: selected in 2025, prototype in 2029, serial production planned for mid-2031 - 2036. Order signed in October 2025, with a €53 million contract signed.
United Kingdom
British Army: common order signed with Germany in October 2025 to replace the existing M3 fleet.

== See also ==
- M104 Wolverine
- M60 AVLB
- M1074 Joint Assault Bridge
- SAMUR Assault Bridge (TUR)
