= SBG =

SBG may refer to:

== Businesses and organisations ==
- Sabre Corporation (ICAO: SBG)
- Saudi Binladin Group, a construction group
- Savage Bingham and Garfield Railroad, a common carrier freight railroad in the U.S.
- Scottish Bus Group
- Shenzhen Bus Group, a franchised bus service operator in Shenzhen, China
- Sinclair Broadcast Group, U.S.
- Skye Bank Guinée, a bank in Guinea
- Straight Blast Gym - Ireland
- Union Bank of Switzerland, (German: Schweizerische Bankgesellschaft)

== Places ==
- Maimun Saleh Airport (IATA: SBG), in Sabang, Pulau Weh, Indonesia
- Sebring station (station code: SBG), Sebring, Florida, U.S.

== Other uses ==
- Scream Bloody Gore, the debut album by death metal band Death
- Siba Giba, French-American record producer
- Seget language (ISO 639-3: sbg), spoken in Indonesia
- Sebat Bet Gurage, the parent language to Chaha, spoken in Ethiopia
- Server-based gaming
- Small Box Girder, a small assault bridge
- Star for Bravery in Gold, a South African military award

== See also ==
- SBGS (disambiguation)
