= AMX-30 Bridge =

- Type: Armoured vehicle-launched bridge
- Place of origin: France

Specifications
- Mass: 42.5 metric tons (94,000 lb)
- Length: 11.40 m (with bridge)
- Width: 3.95 m (with bridge)
- Height: 4.29 m (with bridge)
- Crew: 3
- Armor: 80 mm (3.14 in)
- Engine: Hispano-Suiza HS-110 12 cylinder 700 hp (522 kW)
- Power/weight: 16.5 hp/ton
- Suspension: torsion bar
- Operational range: 600 km (373 miles)
- Maximum speed: 50 km/h (31.1 mph)

The AMX-30 Bridge is a French bridge-laying engineering vehicle based on the AMX-30 tank chassis.

== Design ==
The chassis of this variant is almost identical to the AMX-30. Instead of the turret, a scissors bridge is laid hydraulically over the rear of the vehicle. Deployment and retraction time of the bridge is about 5 minutes, and has a span of 20 meters. The bridge is erected vertically, and can therefore be easily seen by enemy forces.

Night vision optics and NBC (nuclear, biological and chemical) defense systems are standard fittings.

== History ==
The AMX-30 was manufactured by Nexter. The first prototype of the AMX-30 Bridge was built in the mid 60s, but production did not start until the mid 70s.

It was intended to be used in tandem with the AMX-30, having no armament of its own. It was not used by the French Army; 12 vehicles are in use by the Saudi Arabian Army.
