= SBGS =

SBGS may refer to:

- Lithuanian State Border Guard Service
- State Border Guard Service of Ukraine
