= GSB =

GSB may refer to:

== Education ==
- German School Brooklyn
- Gill St. Bernard's School, in Gladstone, New Jersey
- Government School, Bidhwan, in India
- Stanford Graduate School of Business
- University of Chicago Graduate School of Business (now known as Chicago Booth)

== Science ==
- Geological Survey of Bangladesh
- Geological Survey of Belgium
- Green sulfur bacteria

== Other ==
- The IATA airport code for Seymour Johnson Air Force Base
- Gaud Saraswat Brahmin, an Indian Brahmin community
- Gisborne railway station, Australia
- Giusfredi–Bianchi, a cycling team
- Gold Star for Bravery, an award of South Africa
- Government Savings Bank (Thailand)
- Granada Sky Broadcasting, a British television company
- Grivel Scarpa Binding, in mountaineering
- Guiding and Scouting in Belgium
- Greyhound Stud Book, national registration association for British Bred greyhounds
- Gençlik ve Spor Bakanlığı, the Turkish Ministry of Youth and Sports
