= SGB =

SGB may refer to:

== Organisations ==
- Schweizerischer Gewerkschaftsbund, the Swiss Trade Union Federation
- Scholengemeenschap Bonaire, the secondary school on the island of Bonaire
- SGB-SMIT Group, a transformer manufacturer
- St.George Bank (ASX code), an Australian bank
- Société Générale de Belgique, a Belgian bank
- State Security Service of Abkhazia, Abkhazia's intelligence agency

== Entertainment and media ==
- Super Game Boy, a Super Nintendo Entertainment System accessory
- Russian Spetsnaz Guards Brigade, a faction in the Tom Clancy's EndWar video game and novelization

== Transport ==
- Smethwick Galton Bridge railway station, West Midlands, England (station code: SGB)
- Surabaya Gubeng railway station, Surabaya, East Java, Indonesia (station code: SGB)

== Other uses ==
- Sozialgesetzbuch, the German Code of social law
- Speedway Great Britain Premiership, the top division
- Speedway Great Britain Championship, the second division
- Supergalactic latitude (SGB), a measure of latitude in the astronomical supergalactic coordinate system
- Steam gun boat, World War II Royal Navy vessels
