= M60 AVLB =

M60 AVLB (armored vehicle launched bridge)
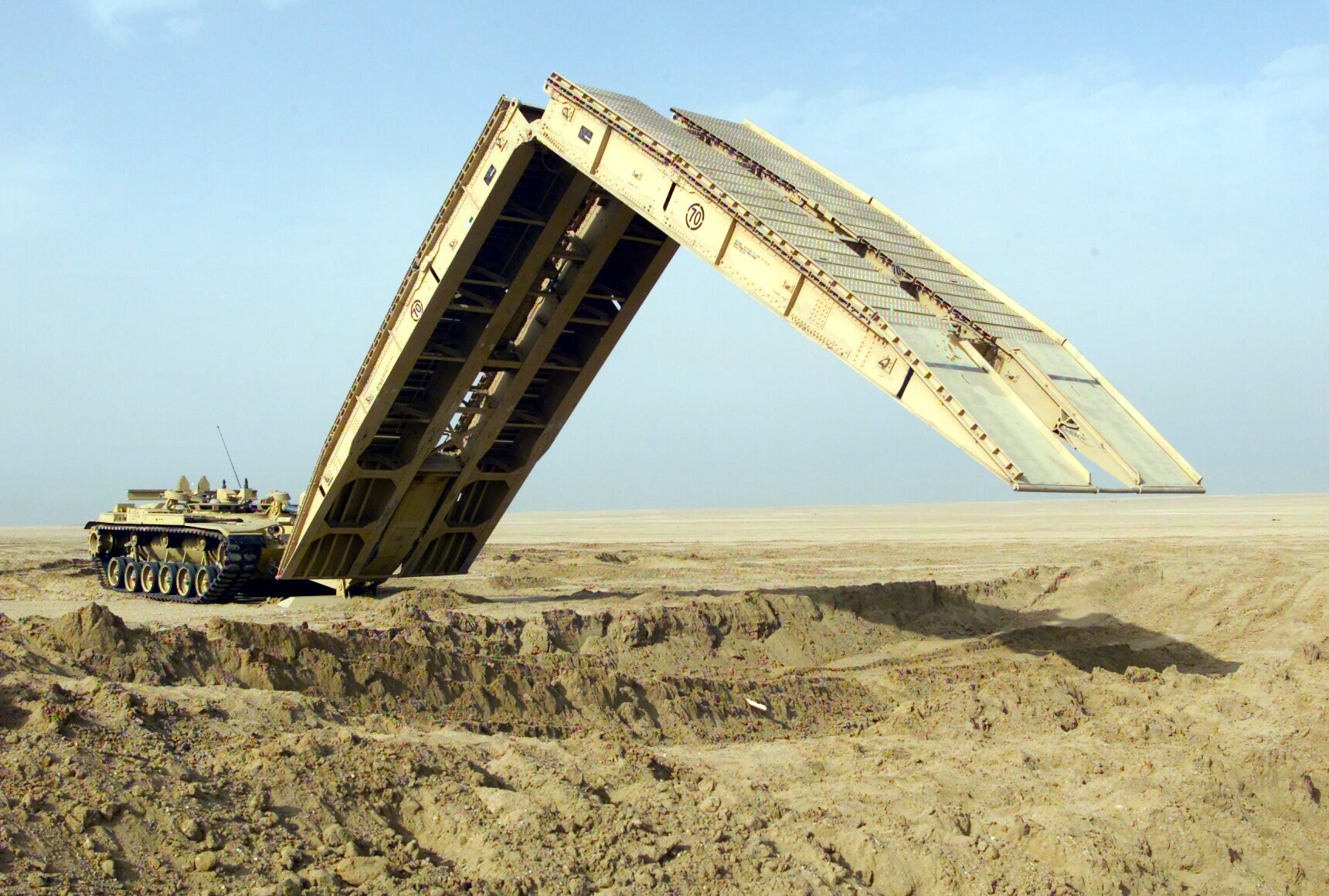
- M60A1 AVLB, Operation Enduring Freedom, Camp Coyote, Kuwait, 6 Feb 2003
- Type: Armored vehicle-launched bridge
- Place of origin: United States

Service history
- In service: 1963–present
- Used by: See operators
- Wars: Cold War; Vietnam War; Yom Kippur War; 1982 Lebanon War; Gulf War; Iraq War; 2006 Lebanon War; War in Afghanistan; 2014 Israel-Gaza Conflict; Russian invasion of Ukraine

Production history
- Designer: US Army Engineer Research & Development Laboratories
- Manufacturer: Anniston Army Depot
- Unit cost: US$749,000 (M60A1 1987) (equivalent to $1.77 million in 2024)
- Produced: M60 AVLB: 1963-1967; M60A1 AVLB: 1987-1996
- No. built: 125 (all variants)
- Variants: See variants

Specifications
- Mass: M60 AVLB Combat Loaded: 53.1 short tons (48.2 t); M60A1 AVLB Combat Loaded: 53.3 short tons (48.4 t) with MLC60 bridge: 67.9 short tons (61.6 t)
- Length: Overall: 9.44 metres (31 ft 0 in)
- Width: 3.66 m (12 ft 0 in)
- Height: 3.3 m (10 ft 10 in)
- Crew: 2 enlisted
- Armor: M60 AVLB Upper Hull Glacis: 3.67 in (93 mm) at 65° 8.68 in (220 mm) LoS; M60A1 AVLB Upper Hull Glacis: 4.29 in (109 mm) at 65° 10.15 in (258 mm) LoS
- Main armament: None
- Secondary armament: M60 / M60A1 AVLB: None; M60 / M60A1 AVLM: 2 M58 Mine Clearing Line Charges
- Engine: Continental (now General Dynamics) AVDS-1790-2DR V12, air-cooled Twin-turbo diesel engine 750 horsepower (560 kW)
- Power/weight: 13.2 hp/t
- Payload capacity: 1× scissors-type folding bridge
- Transmission: CD-850-6A 2 speeds forward, 1 reverse
- Suspension: Torsion bar suspension
- Ground clearance: 457 mm (1 ft 6.0 in)
- Fuel capacity: 1,419 litres (312 imp gal; 375 US gal)
- Operational range: 290 miles (470 km)
- Maximum speed: 30 miles per hour (48 km/h)

The M60 armored vehicle launched bridge (AVLB) is an armored vehicle based on the M60 Patton main battle tank's hull and used for the launching and retrieval of a 60-foot (18 m) scissors-type bridge. The AVLB consists of three major sections: the launcher, the vehicle hull, and the bridge. The M60 AVLB was introduced in 1963. This combat engineer vehicle was developed by the US Army Engineer Research & Development Laboratories under contract with General Dynamics to replace the previous M48 AVLB. It was designed to launch bridge for tanks and other wheeled combat vehicles across trenches and water obstacles in combat conditions. A total of 400 armored bridge launchers and bridges were built. 125 M60 AVLBs of all variants were constructed.

== Design ==
=== Development ===
In the early 1950s, the prototypes for US military AVLBs were based on the M48A2 hull. This AVLB prototype launcher assembly used an M48 tank with its turret removed from the chassis, fitted with a launching system for the scissors bridge carried on top of the hull. This AVLB bridge launching system was designed and tested by the US Army Engineer Research & Development Laboratories at Ft. Belvoir, Virginia. After the 1959 end of production of the M48, the chassis of the similar M60 was used, with 400 launcher assemblies and bridge units produced from 1958 to 1963. Many of these early bridge launcher units were later exported to Israel after the conclusion of the Vietnam War.

=== Description ===
The M60 AVLB is based on the M60 or the M60A1 hulls. Initial construction of the M60 AVLB was from 1963 to 1967. Most of the hulls for the M60A1 AVLB were former M60A2 Pattons converted to AVLBs from 1987 to 1996. All AVLBs were constructed at the Anniston Army Depot, Alabama under contract with General Dynamics Land Systems. The driver and commander are seated side by side in what would normally be the turret ring. Instead of a turret, launching equipment for a scissor bridge is fitted. The scissor bridge is carried in folded position on top of the chassis and the hydraulics for the launcher installed in the former driver's compartment. It is launched towards the front by means of a hydraulic launching arm. The driver has controls to launch and retrieve the bridge. The launching arm features a large bar that features as an outrigger during emplacement. After assault force vehicles have passed over the bridge, the AVLB can cross over, pick up the bridge on the far bank and continue along in support of assault forces. It can produce a limited smokescreen by dumping raw diesel fuel into the exhaust system to visually obscure the area around the vehicle. The smokescreen does not provide protection against infrared, thermal or laser detection. The vehicle does not provide full NBC protection to the crew.

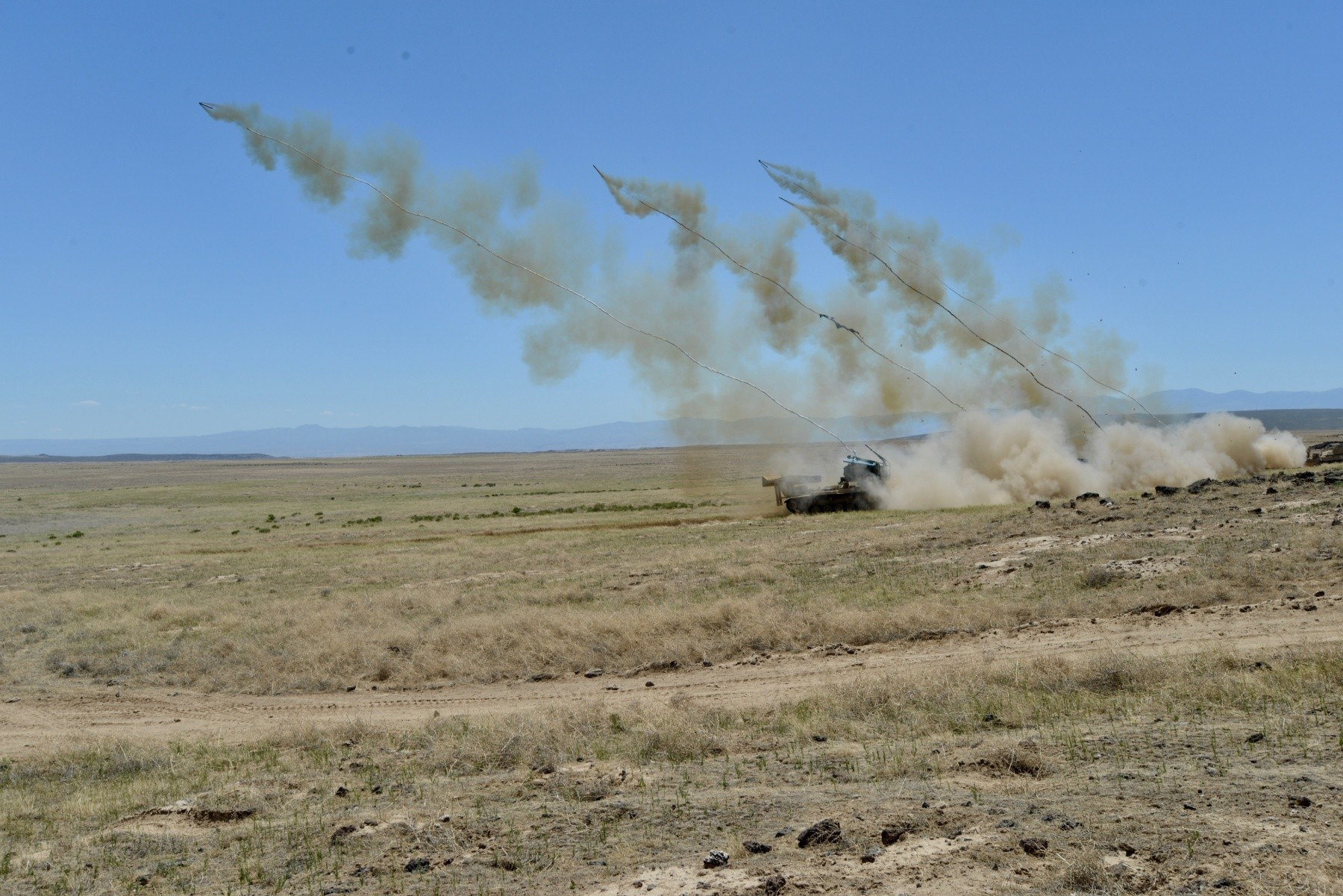
M60 AVLMs of the Idaho Army National Guard firing M58 MICLIC

The vehicle itself is unarmed; however, the crewmembers are typically armed with assault rifles (M16 or M4), pistols, flares, and/or colored smoke grenades. The M60 AVLM carries up to two M58 Mine Clearing Line Charges mounted on the vehicle. The system consists of an M147 firing kit, an M58A3 line charge and a 5-inch MK22 Mod 4 rocket. The line charge is 350 feet long and contains five pounds per linear foot of C-4 explosive. In the event a MICLIC fails to detonate normally, it can be manually activated by time-delay fuses every few feet along its length. The modification of the AVLB into an AVLM is a temporary expedient, to employ the system the vehicle cannot be carrying a bridge.

=== Bridge assembly ===
There were two bridge configurations, formally referred to as a Bridge, Armored-Vehicle Launched: Scissoring Type that were to be carried on the Patton chassis. The scissors-type bridge weights over 13 000 kg, is made of aluminum and can be deployed under armor protection in 3 to 10 minutes, and retrieved and stowed in 10 minutes to an hour depending on terrain. The Military Load Classification (MLC) 60 bridge has sufficient capacity to support the M48 and M60 families of armored vehicles. The MLC 70 bridge supports the heavier M1 Abrams family of armored vehicles.

An upgraded MLC70 bridge was developed for the AVLB during the 1990s at Anniston Army Depot (ANAD). The bridge conversion added stronger materials. After a round of testing in 2012, the MLC 70 was reclassified to the MLC 85. 217 of these bridges were in U.S. inventory as of 2017.

== Service history ==
=== United States ===
Since its introduction in service in 1963, the M60 AVLB has supported the armored forces of the US Army and Marine Corps in many conflicts and military exercises. It was also exported to a handful of nations that also used the Patton series of tanks. Both the M48 AVLB and the M60 AVLB variants were deployed to Vietnam.

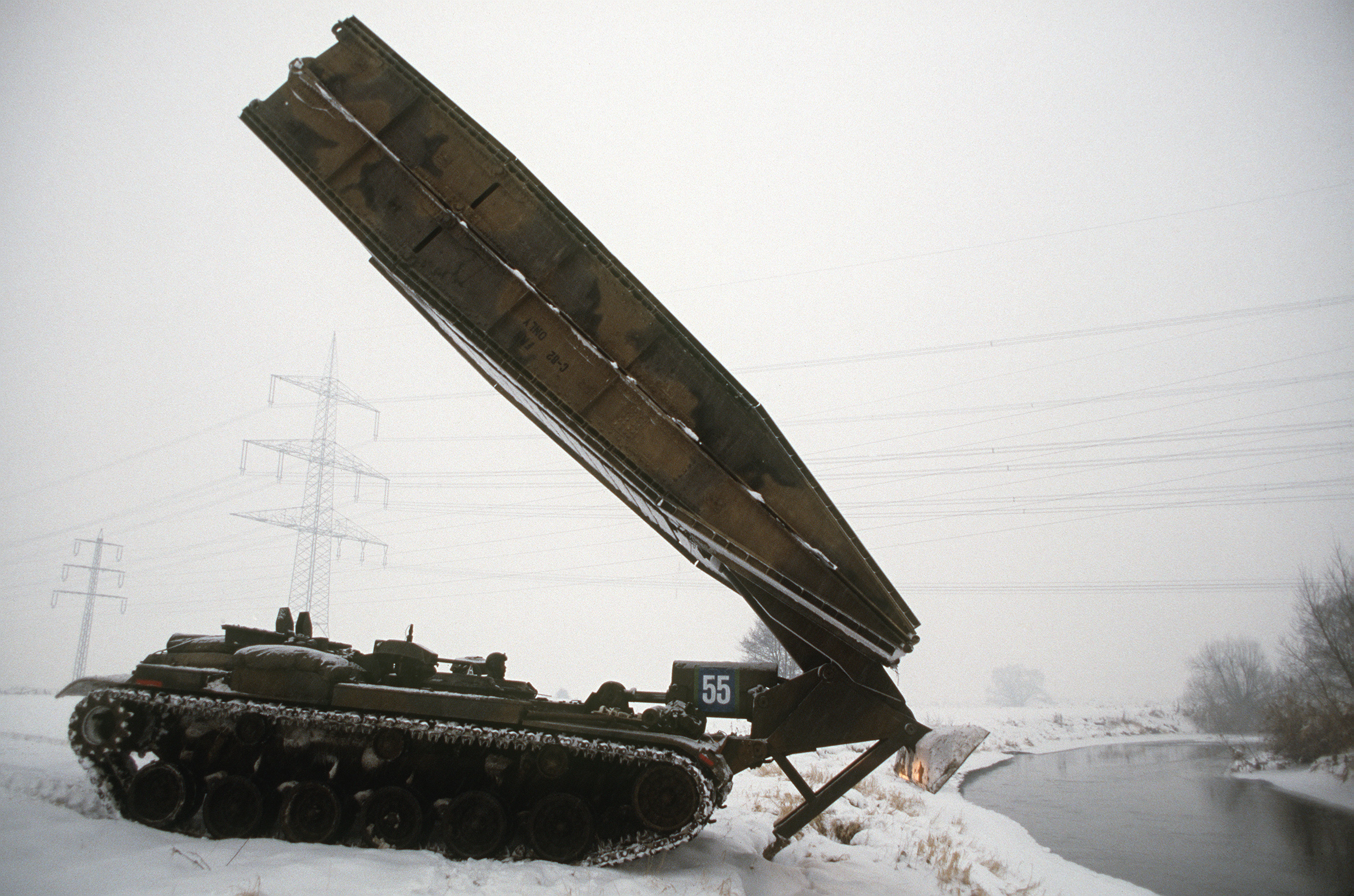
REFORGER 1985, an M60 AVLB deploying its bridge on the banks of Lahn River

During the Cold War, the M60A1 AVLB was deployed to West Germany with US Army Combat Engineer units in support of NATO, notably during annual REFORGER exercises through 1991.

The US Army retired the M60 AVLB from combat use in 2003 and has been superseded by the M104 Wolverine. As of 2018 the vehicle is still in service with the Army National Guard.

The US Marines received their first M60A1 AVLBs in the late 1980s. They have been deployed with Marines Corps armored divisions during Operation Desert Storm in Kuwait and Iraq in 1990 and 2003 Iraq War as well as Operation Enduring Freedom in Afghanistan. As of 2009, the Marines had an inventory of 55 bridges and 37 launchers in service.

The M60-based AVLB has been found to be inadequate to support the M1 Abrams tanks and M2 Bradley armored vehicles, and its age is making it difficult to maintain and sustain with parts becoming obsolete. Furthermore, the Army has determined that the M104 Wolverine is too costly to operate and maintain, causing its production to be suspended. Both the Army and Marine Corps are planning to replace the vehicles with the M1074 Joint Assault Bridge (JABS). The JAB also has a faster deployment time, with a set-up of three minutes compared to AVLB's ten-minute set-up. First deliveries are planned in mid-2017, with low-rate initial production expected to be reached in 2019. As of 2020, The Marine Corps was divesting the AVLB as part of Force Design 2030.

=== Israel ===
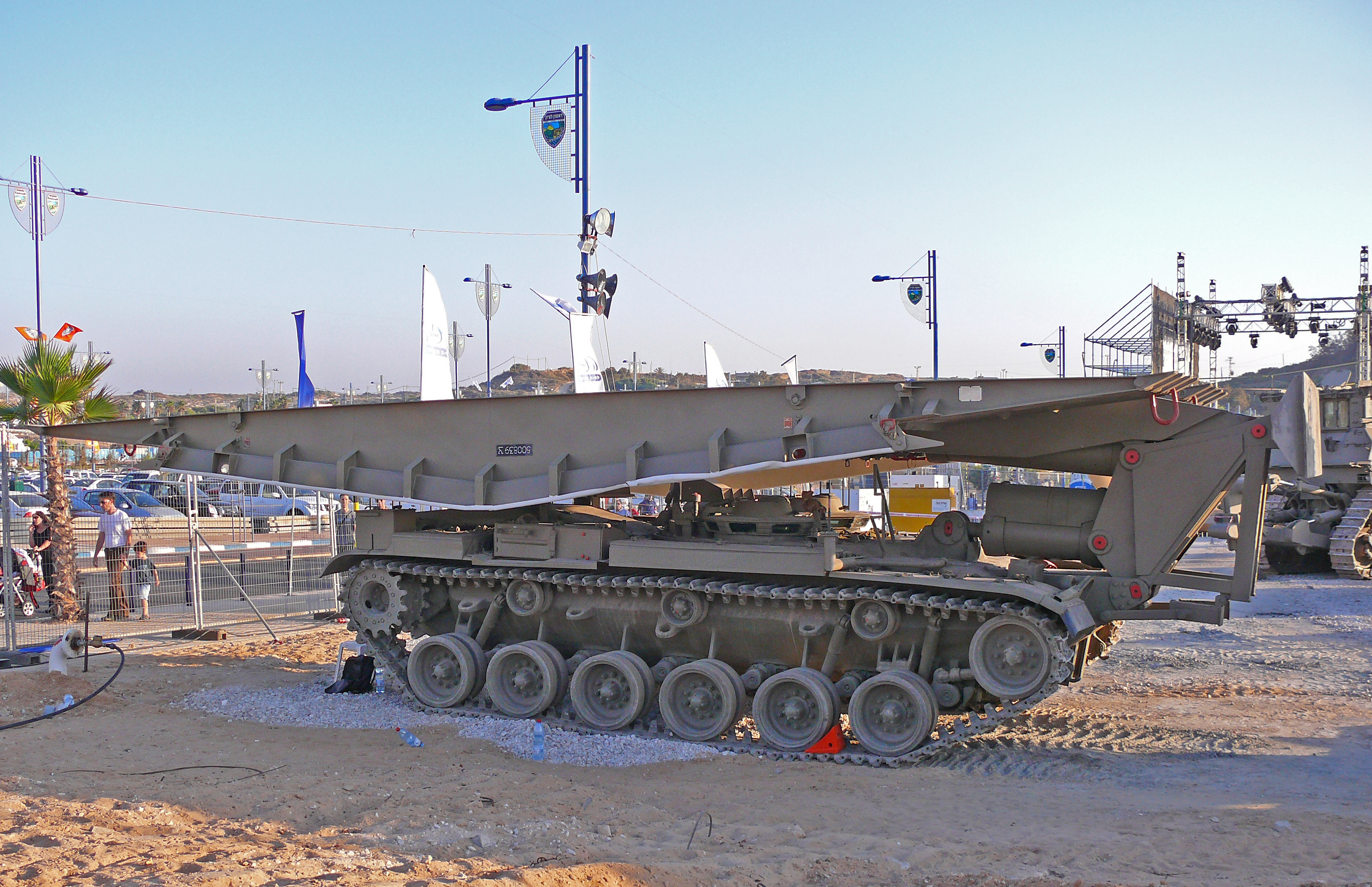
M60 Tagash AVLB with Tzmed bridge section

The IDF refers to the AVLB as the Tagash. The first armored bridge layers to enter service with the Israel Defense Force were constructed from captured Jordanian M48s. The United States supplied launcher and bridge assemblies for the AVLBs through the 1970s. They were mated to M48 and M60 series hulls by Israeli Military Industries TAAS Slavin Plant. The Tagash AVLB has supported the IDF in the Yom Kippur War, 1982 Lebanon War, 2006 Lebanon War and the 2014 Israel-Gaza Conflict. The IDF continues to use the M60A1-based bridge layers except with modifications. Vehicle modifications included new all-steel Merkava tracks and drive sprockets, although some vehicles continue to use the original T142 track. Due to the growing use of a number of trenches in fortifications and the greater number of natural narrower obstacles rather than larger ones, a tandem assembly bridge called the Tzmed or tandem was engineered. Two bridge sections can be fitted to any M60 AVLB system without any modification to the launcher. The main advantage to an up-and-out system compared to a horizontal system is the reduced mechanical complexity. The Tzmed assembly also enables the AVLB to bridge gaps in which the elevation of the opposing bank and the bridge itself, when laid out, is steep. The Tzmed assembly weighs in at only 13.5 tons with two bridge sections.

=== Other users ===
The Spanish Army began the Programa Coraza – 2000 (Program Armor – 2000) in March 1995 to modernize and update its armor forces. One of its goals is the development of a new armored vehicle launching bridge (AVLB), based on the M60A1 chassis and equipped with the new MLC 70 class Leguan bridge, which is capable of supporting the Leopard 2 A5 tanks, as well as any other tanks and armored vehicles in the Spanish inventory. For the time being in close liaison with Engineers at the Army Logistics Command has contracted for an initial 12 vehicles.

They are still in service with a few other countries including Portugal, Singapore and Pakistan.

== Specification ==
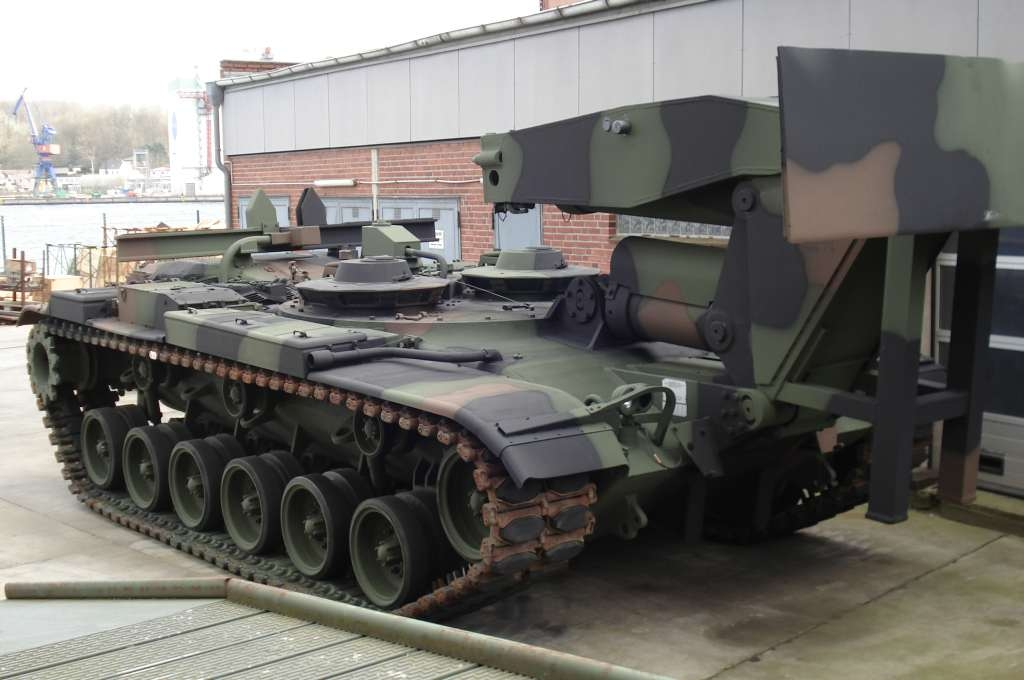
M60A1 AVLB without bridge

NSN 5420-00-889-2020 / NIIN 008892020 : Armored Vehicle Launched Bridge (AVLB), M60A1
Manufacturer: Anniston Army Depot (ANAD)
Contractor: General Dynamics Land Systems Division
Power plant: AVDS-1790-2DA 12-cylinder diesel engine
Power train: CD-850-6A 2 speeds forward, 1 reverse
Introduction date: February 1987
Unit Replacement Cost: $749,000 without bridge

=== M60A1 AVLB hull and launcher ===
Weight, combat loaded: 53.3 tons, 67.9 tons with MLC60 bridge
Armor: Upper hull Glacis M60A1: 4.29 in (109 mm) at 65° - 10.15 in (258 mm) LoS
Ground clearance: 18 inches (46 centimeters)
Length: 31 feet (9.4 meters)
Width: 12 feet (3.7 meters)
Maximum speed (governed): 30 miles/hour (48.3 km/h)
Cross country speed: 8–12 miles/hour (12–19 km/h)
Trench crossing: 8.5 feet (2.6 meters)
Range: 290 miles (470 kilometers)
Fuel capacity: 375 U.S. gallons (1,420 liters)
Crew: 2 enlisted

=== Bridge, Armored-Vehicle Launched: Scissoring Type MLC60 ===
Length, extended: 63 feet (19 meters)
Length, folded: 32 feet (9.8 meters)
Bridge span: 60 feet (18 meters)
Width, overall: 13.1 feet (4.0 meters)
Width, roadway: 12.5 feet (3.8 meters)
Width, treadway: 5.75 feet (1.75 meters)
Height, unfolded: 3.1 feet (0.94 meters)
Weight: 14.65 tons (13.28 metric tons)

== Variants ==
- M48 AVLB- Early models were based on the M48A2 Patton chassis. Some foreign M48 chassis, namely Israel, have been converted as well.
- M60 AVLB – AVLB with 60 ft (18 m) scissors bridge and launcher mated to the M60 hull
- M60A1 AVLB – version mated to the M60A1 hull
- M60 / M60A1 AVLM- M60 or M60A1 AVLB with up to 2 vehicle mounted MICLICs.

== Operators ==
- Israel: 10× M60A1 Tagash AVLB in service with Israeli Army
- Pakistan: 12 M60A1 AVLB in service with the Pakistan Army as of 2013
- Portugal: 4× M60 AVLB in service with Portuguese Army
- Singapore: 12× M60 AVLB in service with Singapore Army
- Spain: 15× M60A1 AVLB in service with Spanish Army
- Ukraine: $400 Million direct transfer of excess US military equipment, including 8 M60 AVLBs
- United States: United States Army retired combat use 2003; estimated 230 M60 AVLB as of January 2025; superseded by M104 Wolverine, in service with the Army National Guard and 37 in service with the USMC as of 2009. To be replaced by the M1074 Joint Assault Bridge starting 2019. AVLB is being divested by USMC as of 2020.

=== Former operators ===
- Greece: 12 M60 AVLBs retired from service in 2015. Replaced with Leopard 2 Panzerschnellbrücke Leguan BridgeLayer.

== See also ==
- List of U.S. military vehicles by model number
- G-numbers (SNL G301)
- M104 Wolverine
- M3 Amphibious Rig
