= AM 50 =

Czech assault bridge

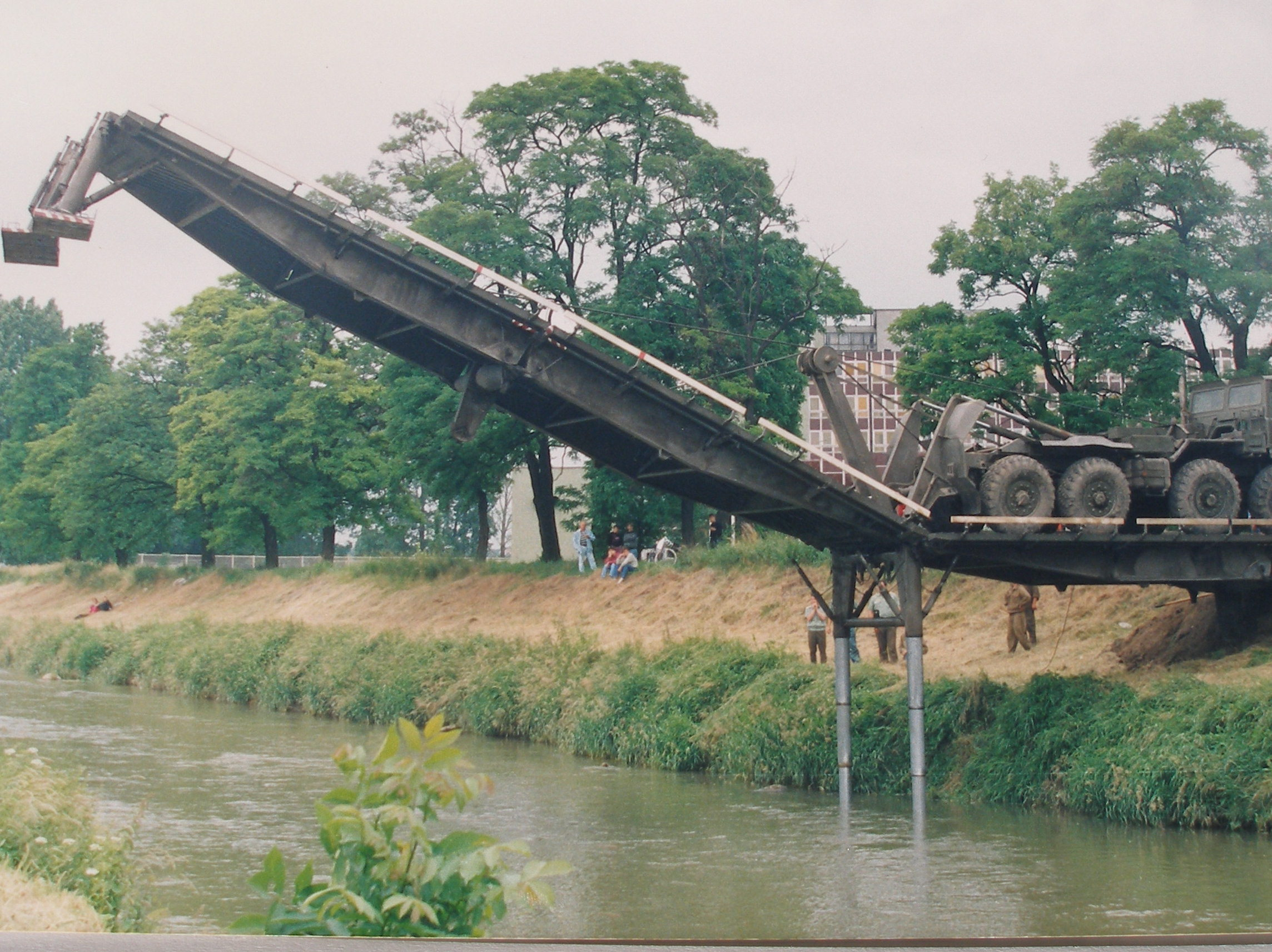
A Slovak AM-50 laying a fast bridge over the Torysa (1995)

AM 50 is a Czechoslovak, automatically launched assault bridge, that is used by combat engineers for crossing narrow obstacles such as rivers, canals, and ditches that are 10-12 meters wide. It is based on a Tatra 813 8×8 truck.

The AM 50 was developed for the Czechoslovak Army in the late 1960s. Today it is in use in the Czech Republic, Slovakia, India, Pakistan and Vietnam.

== Development ==
Work on the vehicle began in 1968 and went through 1969, with the vehicle entering service with the Czechoslovak People's Army in 1972. Even though the original AM 50 variant was based on the Tatra 813 chassis, modern variants like the AM 50/70 EX are based on a modern Tatra 815-7 chassis.

== Variants ==
=== AM 50 ===
Original variant

=== AM 50 EX ===
Modernized variant

=== AM 70 ===
Only one prototype was built.

=== AM 70 EX ===
Modernized variant.

== Technical data ==
Variant	AM 50	AM 50 EX	AM 70	AM 70 EX
Crew	3	3		
Engine	Tatra T-930-17 12 cylinder, direct injection diesel engine	Tatra T3C-928-90 8 cylinder, air cooled, turbochargeddirect injection diesel engine		
Power output	247 hp (247 hp; 250 PS) at 2,000 rpm	402.3 hp (402.3 hp; 407.9 PS) at 1,800 rpm		
Torque output	959.9 Nm at 1,400 rpm	2100.2 Nm at 1,000 rpm		
Transmission	Synchromesh gearbox with automatic split, mechanical gear-shifting, normal or reduced drive mode, 5 forward gears, 1 reverse gear	Tatra 14 TS 210: Synchromesh gearbox; 14 forward gears, 2 reverse gears		
Clutch	Dry, triple-plate, with hydraulic control	MFZ 1x430: single-plate; diaphragm clutch; 1x430 mm; attached to the engine fly wheel; hydraulic control with pressure-air power cylinder		
Fuel capacity	200 litres	420 litres		
Top speed (on road)	80 kilometers per hour	85 kilometers per hour		
Top speed (off-road)	14 - 31 kilometers per hour	?		
Fuel consumption	1.67 - 2.09 kilometers per litre	?		
Cruising range on road	?	500 kilometers		
Angle of approach/departure	35° / 30°	35° (without dozer blade) / 25°		
Wading depth	1.4 meters	1.19 meters (without preparation) 1.5 meters (with preparation)		
Superstructure	Scissor bridge: Payload: 49.7 tonnes; Length of one bay: 13.5 meters; Width of the carriageway: 4.0 meters; Total width: 4.21 meters; Maximum length of bridged obstacle: 108 meters (8 bays)	M-50 EX scissor bridge with parameters in MLC 50: Length of one bay: 13.5 meters; Width of the carriageway: 4.0 meters or 4.39 meters; Maximum length of the bridge: 108 meters (8 bays)		
Gross vehicle weight (with bridge)	24,450 kg	30,000 kg		
Gross vehicle weight (without bridge)	17,350 kg	?		
Length (with bridge)	10.7 meters	11.25 meters		
Length (without bridge)	10.3 meters	?		
Width (with bridge)	3.15 meters	3.4 meters		
Width (without bridge)	2.45 meters	?		
Ground clearance	?	40 centimeters		
Sources				

== See also ==
- Armoured vehicle-launched bridge
- Bailey bridge
