= M104 Wolverine =

US armored bridge-laying vehicle

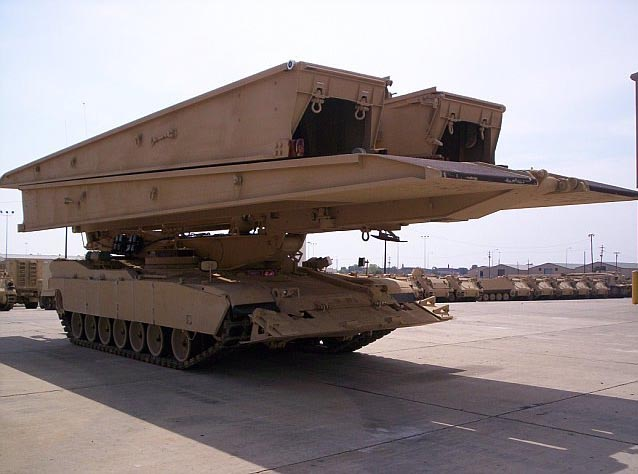
M104 Wolverine Heavy Assault Bridge from 59th Mobility Augmentation Company (MAC), 20th Engineer Battalion, U.S. Army.

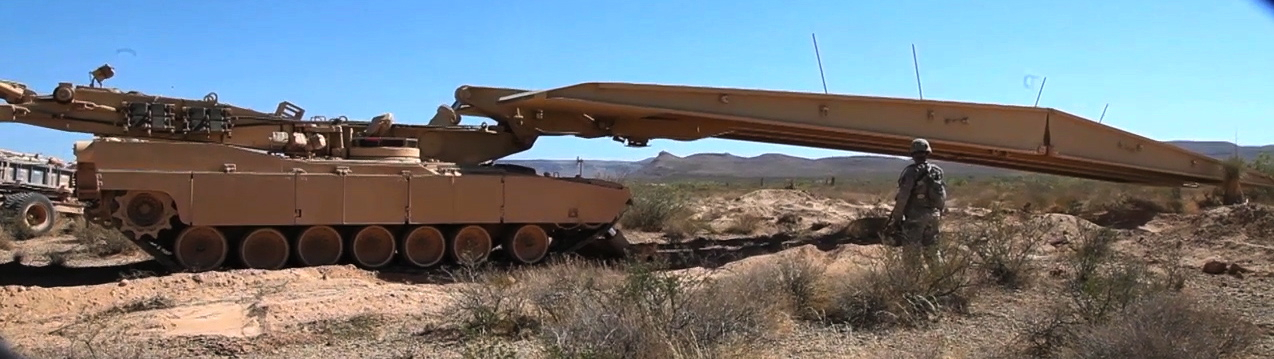
The 2nd Engineer Battalion, 40th Mobility Augmentation Company, makes a bridge for the 3rd Battalion, 41st Infantry Regiment near Oro Grande Range, N.M., during Iron Focus.

The M104 Wolverine "Heavy Assault Bridge" is United States armored vehicle-launched bridge vehicle, designed to lay down a bridge in combat.

== Background ==
Since the 1960s the United States Army has made use of armored bridge-laying vehicles based on the M48 Patton/M60 series of tanks. In recent years, however, the Army discovered that the aging M60 AVLB was too slow to keep up with the M1 Abrams main battle tanks' top speed of roughly 70 km/h during field maneuvers. Additionally, the Abrams was so heavy that it could safely cross the AVLB's bridge only at a very slow speed.

Program development for a new armored bridge-laying vehicle began in 1983, and by 1994 General Dynamics Land Systems and the German MAN Mobile Bridges GmbH (since 2005 Krauss-Maffei Wegmann) had been awarded a contract. The first prototype vehicles were being tested by 1996, and the first production models were delivered by 2003.

== Description ==
Because the Wolverine is essentially an M1A2 SEP tank with Leguan bridge-laying gear instead of a turret, it shares virtually all of the parent vehicle's speed, mobility, survivability, and automotive components. This commonality was a key design factor in the Wolverine's development. The Wolverine also features an advanced communications package designed to keep it in contact with local field commanders. However, the vehicle itself is completely unarmed.

The Wolverine is operated by two crewmen who sit within the hull. Both crewmen have access to the bridging controls, while the bridge is carried in two sections, stacked above the hull. Once a bridging site is chosen the vehicle securely anchors itself in place with a spade. The two sections of the bridge are joined together, and then the entire bridge is extended across the obstacle and dropped into place. The crewmen have the ability to make minor corrections during launch, if needed. Once operations are complete, the Wolverine drives across the bridge and retrieves it from the other side simply by reversing the process. The bridge can be lowered in under five minutes or raised in less than ten minutes, all without the crewmen ever leaving the safety of their vehicle.

Once launched, the 26-meter Leguan bridge can support a 70-ton vehicle moving at 16 km/h, or 10 miles per hour. The Wolverine thus allows the heaviest of vehicles to cross craters, ditches, and damaged bridges at combat speed. This mobility is a decisive advantage for armored units.

== Future plans and replacement ==
To date the United States Army has received 44 Wolverines, which have been distributed to a few select engineer units. Production concluded in 2003. The Army had originally intended to purchase 465 vehicles; however, budget cuts and a shift in philosophy toward a lighter fighting force meant that the Army no longer needed hundreds of bridgelaying vehicles. When the Army discontinued production it had reserved the right to restart production if necessary.

In 2006, Anniston Army Depot completed a demonstrator AVLB based on the TITAN bridge from BAE Systems and an M1A1 chassis. The U.S. Marine Corps had a requirement for 29 vehicles. The Army later became involved in this program, seeking 168 systems. In 2016 the Army chose this program as its replacement for the Wolverine. The program was subsequently classified as the M1074 Joint Assault Bridge (JAB).

The Joint Assault Bridge also has an Abrams tank chassis but is equipped with a 18.3-metre (60 ft) scissor bridge. While the M104 was intended to replace the AVLB, it was found to be too expensive and complicated to maintain and operate. While the JAB's bridge is shorter, it has a faster deployment time of three minutes, compared to the Wolverine's 3-5 minute set-up time. In 2016, the U.S. Army awarded DRS Technologies an indefinite quantity contract worth up to $400 million to build the new M1074 JAB. Low-rate production concluded in mid-2018, and initial series production began in 2019.

== See also ==
- List of U.S. military vehicles by model number
- Titan
- AM 50 automatically launched assault bridge
- M1074 Joint Assault Bridge
- List of land vehicles of the U.S. Armed Forces
