= M1074 Joint Assault Bridge System =

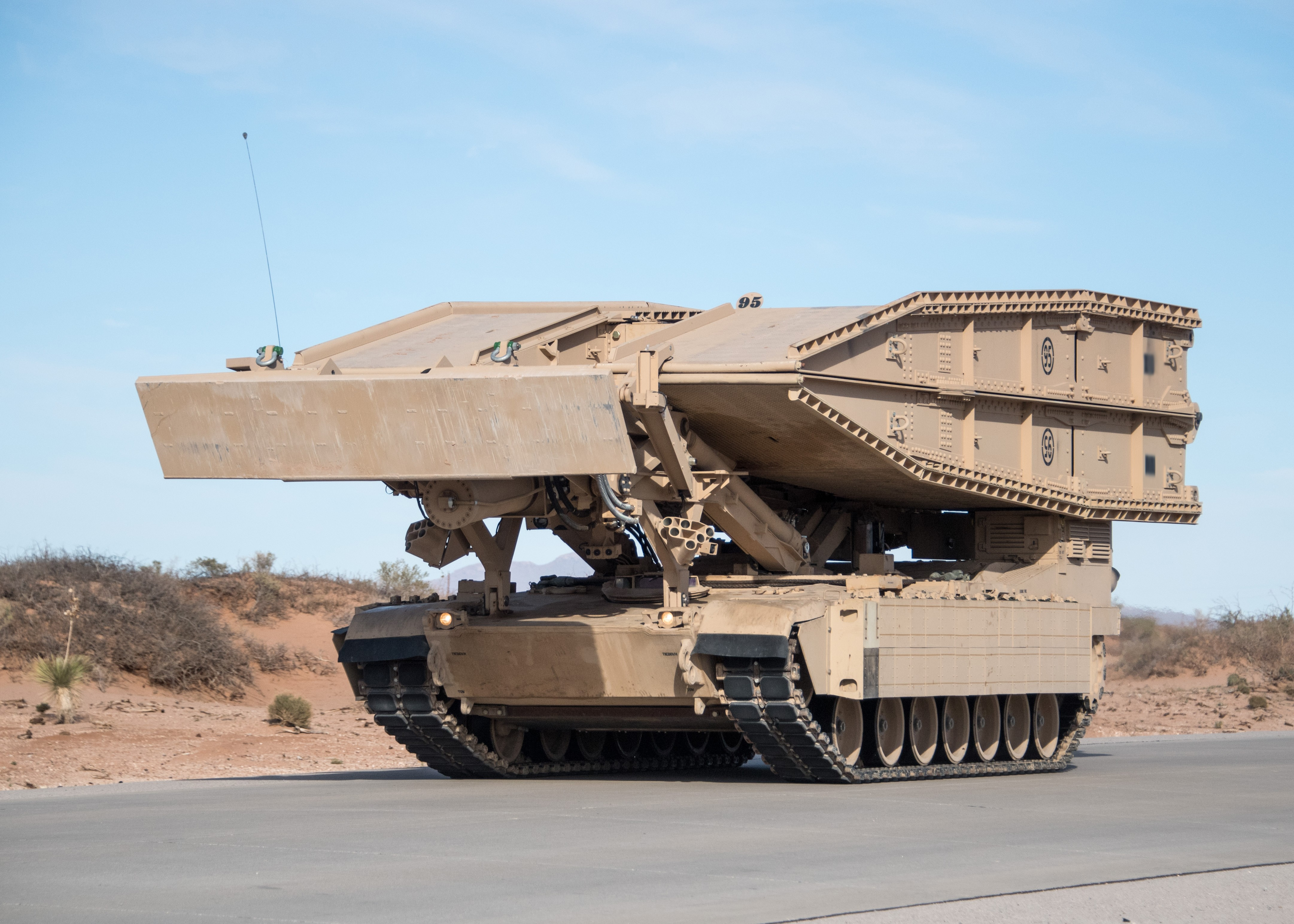
- M1074 Joint Assault Bridge System
- Type: Armored vehicle-launched bridge
- Place of origin: United States

Service history
- In service: 2016–present
- Used by: United States Army; United States Marine Corps

Production history
- Designer: United States Army; Tank Automotive Research, Development and Engineering Center (TARDEC)
- Designed: 2012
- Manufacturer: Leonardo DRS, West Plains, Missouri; Anniston Army Depot (final assembly)
- Unit cost: $1.87 million with MLC95 bridge (2018)
- Produced: in production as of 2016
- No. built: 144 (as of 2024) Full rate production starts 2021

Specifications
- Mass: 68.7 short tons (62.3 t)
- Length: 32.25 ft (9.83 m) with bridge
- length: MLC115 folding scissors bridge 11.7 meters. Bridge weight 15 short tons (14 t)
- Width: 12 ft (3.66 m)
- Height: Hull: 5.6 ft (1.71 m) with bridge: 10.1 ft (3.08 m)
- Crew: 2 enlisted
- Armor: Burlington composite armor
- Main armament: None
- Secondary armament: None
- Engine: Honeywell AGT1500C multi-fuel turbine engine 1,500 shp (1,120 kW)
- Power/weight: 23.8 hp/t (17.74 kW/t)
- Payload capacity: 1× scissors-type folding bridge MLC115 (HASB)
- Transmission: Allison DDA X-1100-3B (4 forward 2 reverse gears)
- Suspension: High-hardness-steel torsion bars with rotary shock absorbers
- Ground clearance: 0.48 m (1 ft 7 in)
- Fuel capacity: 500 US gallons (1,900 L; 420 imp gal)
- Operational range: 260 miles (420 km)
- Maximum speed: Road 45 mph (72 km/h) (governed); Off-road: 30 mph (48 km/h)

The M1074 Joint Assault Bridge System (JAB, JABS) is an American armored military engineering vehicle based on the Abrams M1A1 main battle tank chassis. The M1074 was designed by Leonardo DRS for the U.S. Army and Marine Corps to provide deployable bridge capability for units engaged in military operations.

The bridge is an armored vehicle-launched bridge (AVLB) Military Load Class 95 Scissor Bridge (MLC95) is currently being replaced with the Heavy Assault Scissor Bridge (HASB) MLC 115. After the M1074 has deployed the bridge, assault force vehicles can cross over the bridge. The M1074 can cross over, pick up the bridge on the far bank and continue along in support of assault forces.

== Development ==
The JABS was conceived as a compromise between the M104 Wolverine that was deemed too expensive to operate and the aging M60 Patton-based M60 AVLB which could not adequately support the Abrams and Bradley vehicles. The vehicle provides the Army Mobility Augmentation Companies supporting Armored Brigade Combat Teams with a survivable, deployable and sustainable heavy-assault-bridging capability. Prototype development began in May 2012 when the U.S. Army Contracting Command awarded General Dynamics Land Systems and Leonardo DRS a $26 million contract to build two Joint Assault Bridge System (JABS) prototypes. The contract supported the engineering and manufacturing development phase, with the GDLS prototype being built in Sterling Heights, Michigan and the Leonardo prototype built in West Plains, Missouri.

The Army wanted the winner of the contract to include Anniston Army Depot (ANAD)'s organic industrial base experience in the JAB's production. The XM1074 JABS prototypes were ready in 2014. They were delivered to ANAD where they underwent testing and evaluation through 2016 with the Leonardo prototype being accepted as the M1074 in August. Leonardo DRS has a public-private partnership with ANAD in Alabama to manage the M1 chassis assembly and worked with Israeli Military Industries (IMI) on the design and engineering of the bridge system, according to a DRS statement. On August 23, 2016, DRS Technologies, Inc., announced that the U.S. Army had awarded it an indefinite quantity contract worth up to $400 million to build the new JABS. The Army has placed an initial order for 168 vehicles and the Marines for 29. As of 2020, the status of the USMC's order was unclear as the service was divesting its AVLBs as part of Force Design 2030.

The JAB completed its low-rate production phase from 2016 to 2018 with a total of 51 vehicles. ANAD produced 10 in fiscal year 2016, 14 in 2017 and an additional 27 in 2018. These first JABSs underwent exploitation and fire survivability testing at the Aberdeen Test Center. These tests finalized the current configuration for full-rate production and evaluated some configuration changes in the design for crew protection. United States Army Operational Test Command, Fort Bliss began conducting operational testing in April 2019, with the 40th Brigade Engineer Battalion, 2nd Armored Brigade Combat team, 1st Armored Division.

Full-rate production is scheduled to start in 2021 and expected to be completed by May 2030 with a program of record of 297 for the US Army. The M1074 JAB will fully replace the M60 AVLB and M104 Wolverine on a one-for-one basis in the United States Army and Army National Guard.

The Australian Army is planning to purchase 18 M1074s, with the US Government granting approval for this in April 2021.

Poland signed an agreement with Washington in April 2022 to acquire 17 JABS.

== Description ==
The M1074 Joint Assault Bridge System (JABS) is based on the hull of the M1A1 version of the M1 Abrams main battle tank using the suspension system from the M1A2 and upgraded with the Total InteGrated Engine Revitalization (TIGER). This is projected to lower maintenance costs as well as increased availability and unit readiness with commonality of parts with the Abrams chassis. The unit has a new hydraulic bridge launcher system as well as Embedded Diagnostics (ED). Survivability is enhanced with components of the Tank Urban Survivability Kit (TUSK) including Abrams Reactive Armor Tile (ARAT1), Rear Viewer Sensor System (RVSS) and Tank-Infantry Phone (TIP). Additionally it can employ the AUTOFLUG Driver's Seat and Abrams Lightweight Underbody Kit for situational use. The vehicle itself is unarmed; however, the crewmembers are typically armed with assault rifles (M16 or M4), pistols, flares, and/or colored smoke grenades.

The Bridge Launcher Mechanism (BLM) was designed by Israeli Military Industries in conjunction with Leonardo DRS. The bridging controls are a basic push-button system, similar to the M104 Wolverine, while the computer assembles the bridge and deploys it. The bridge extends its span vertically instead of horizontally as the M104 Wolverine. It can deploy an MLC115 (Caution 120) Heavy Assault Scissor Bridge (HASB) with a gap crossing of 18.3 m in approximately 3 minutes.

== Operators ==
=== Current operators ===
- United States
  - United States Army - 120 as of January 2025
  - United States Marine Corps

=== Future operators ===
- Australia: 18xM1074 joint assault bridges.
- Poland: 25xM1110 joint assault bridges.
- Romania: 4xM1110 joint assault bridges.
- Bahrain: 8xM1110 Joint Assault Bridges.

== See also ==
- M104 Wolverine
- M60 AVLB

== Sources ==
- Zaloga, Steve; Sarson, Peter (1993). M1 Abrams Main Battle Tank 1982–1992. New Vanguard (Book 2). Oxford, UK: Osprey Publishing. ISBN 1-85532-283-8.
