= MT-55 =

MT-55A armoured bridgelayer
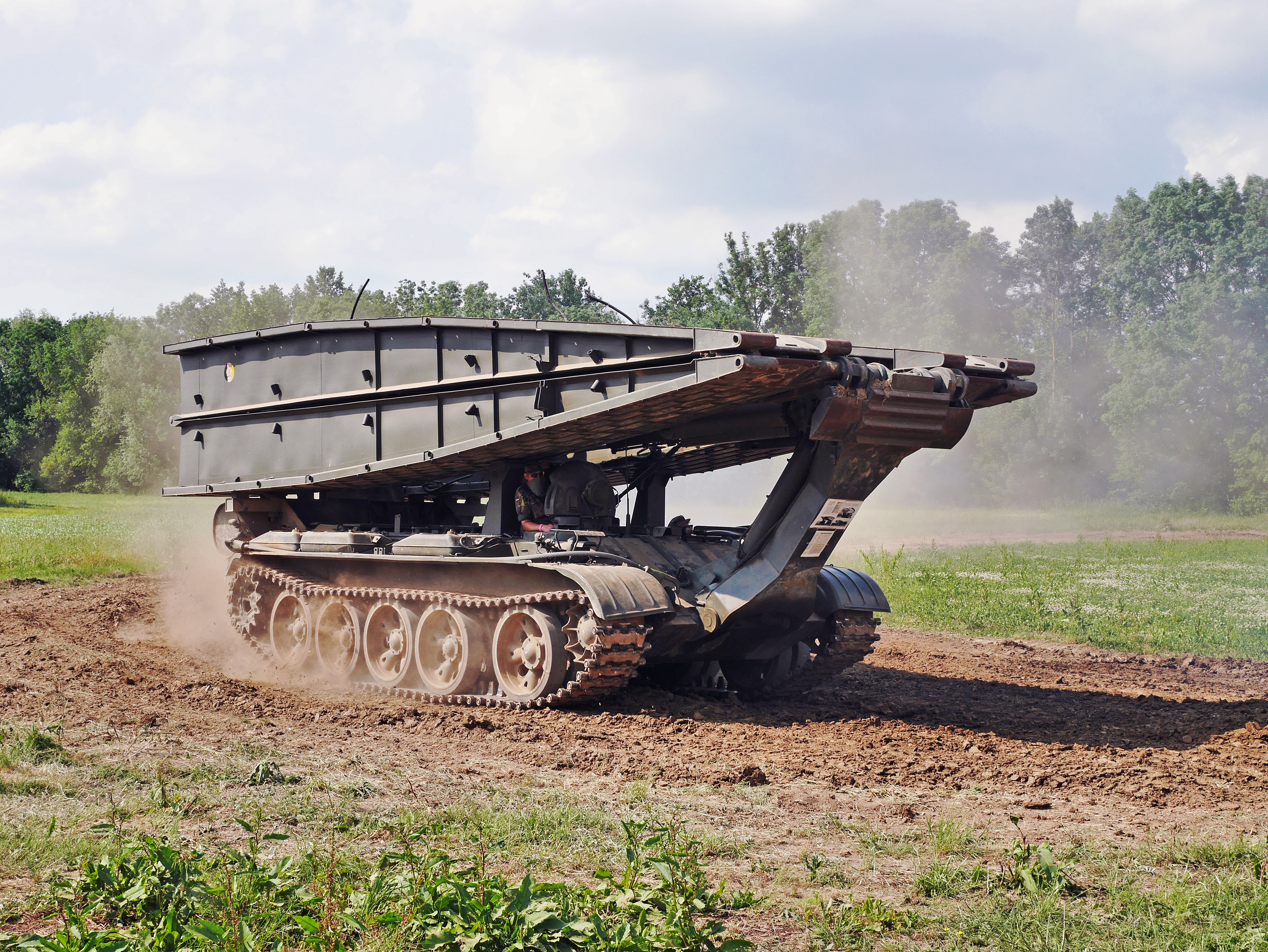
- MT-55 at speed in Uffenheim in 2015
- Type: Armoured vehicle-launched bridge
- Place of origin: Czechoslovakia

Specifications
- Mass: 36.0 tonnes
- Length: 9,880 mm (with span)
- Width: 3,300 mm (with span)
- Height: 3,350 mm (with span)
- Crew: 2 (commander, driver)
- Engine: V-55 12-cyl. 38.88 liter water-cooled diesel 580 hp (430 kW)
- Power/weight: 14 hp/tonne
- Suspension: Torsion bar
- Operational range: 580 km (On roads)
- Maximum speed: 50 km/h

The MT-55A (Slovak: Mostný tank) is an armoured vehicle-launched bridge (AVLB) tank, manufactured by ZŤS Martin in Slovakia. The AVLB is based on a T-55A medium tank chassis, with the turret detached and replaced by a special bridge launching equipment.

The MT-55A was produced for the armies of the Warsaw Pact (including the Soviet Army), as well as for export clients.

== Design and development ==
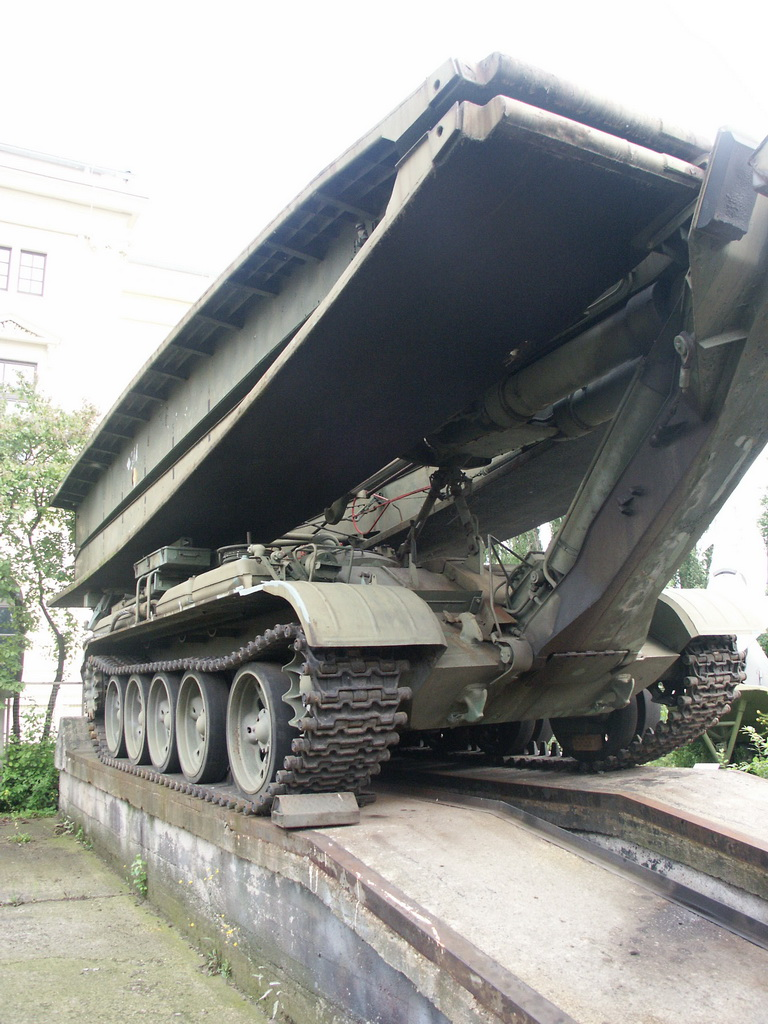
BLG-60M2 at the Bundeswehrmuseum Dresden.

The MT-55, Base T-55, was designed and produced by ZŤS Martin from 1962 (the former Czechoslovakia was one of the countries that build the T-54/55 series under licence). The development phase ended in 1967 after which five pre-series vehicles were built. The MT-55A, Base T-55A, series production started in 1969.

The transformed T-55A chassis differs by the arrangement of the compartments in the hull. The bridge tank is proposed for an easy and swift crossing of antitank barriers (trenches) and other obstacles with the purpose of facilitating the passage of mechanised and tank units.

The bridge initiating equipment is controlled by a system of hydraulic cylinders; the allocation of hydraulic oil can be controlled both manually by mechanical levers and automatically. The pressure of the liquid is provided by high-pressure piston pumps motorized by the tank engine. All mechanisms of the MT-55A used for laying and recovering the bridge can be controlled by the crew from inside the tank with the hatch covers closed.

To begin the launching process, the vehicle stops short of the gap; then, the bridge swings ahead and down while its two sections open like scissors. The MT-55A span is 18 meters long and can support loads of up to 50 tons. Later, the MT-55A was modified with a gap measuring mechanism and infrared equipment for bridge laying in darkness.

Total production of the MT-55A between 1969 and 1983 amounted to 1,762 vehicles, including 183 export versions MT-55KS (from 1971) and 458 hulls for East Germany's BLG-60 programme.

== Variants ==
- MT-55 - Pre-series model, equipped with the bridge of the MT-34 bridge-layer. In Western sources, this model is often erroneously referred to as the MT-55L with "long" bridge.
- MT-55A - Standard model, as described.
- MT-55KS (Kapitalstické Státy) - Export model for "capitalist" non-Warsaw Pact countries. Based on the T-55A without radiation protection layer both otherwise similar.
- PM-55 (Přepravník Mostu) - Wheeled version, based on a Tatra 813 "Kolos" 8x8 truck.

== Operators ==
- Belarus - MT-55A
- Egypt - MT-55KS
- Croatia - MT-55A
- Czech Republic - MT-55A
- Georgia - MT-55A
- India - MT-55KS, known as Bridge Laying Tank MT-55
- Iraq - MT-55KS
- Israel: The Israeli Defence Forces (IDF) were able to capture a small number of MT-55KSs from their Arab counterparts and used them with some small modifications. Most of them were captured on the Southern front (Gaza Strip and Sinai Peninsula) during the Six-Day War.
- Myanmar:MT-55A
- North Korea
- Romania - MT-55A
- Russia - MT-55A, known as MTU-55
- Serbia - MT-55A
- Slovakia - MT-55A
- Slovenia
- Sri Lanka - In 2000, the Sri Lanka Army bought eight MT-55As from the Czech Republic along with 40 T-55AM2 tanks, 16 VT-55 recovery vehicles, three mobile workshop vehicles, 12 Tatra T815 tank transporters and several RM-70 122 mm multiple rocket launchers.
- Syria - MT-55A/KS
- Ukraine - MT-55A

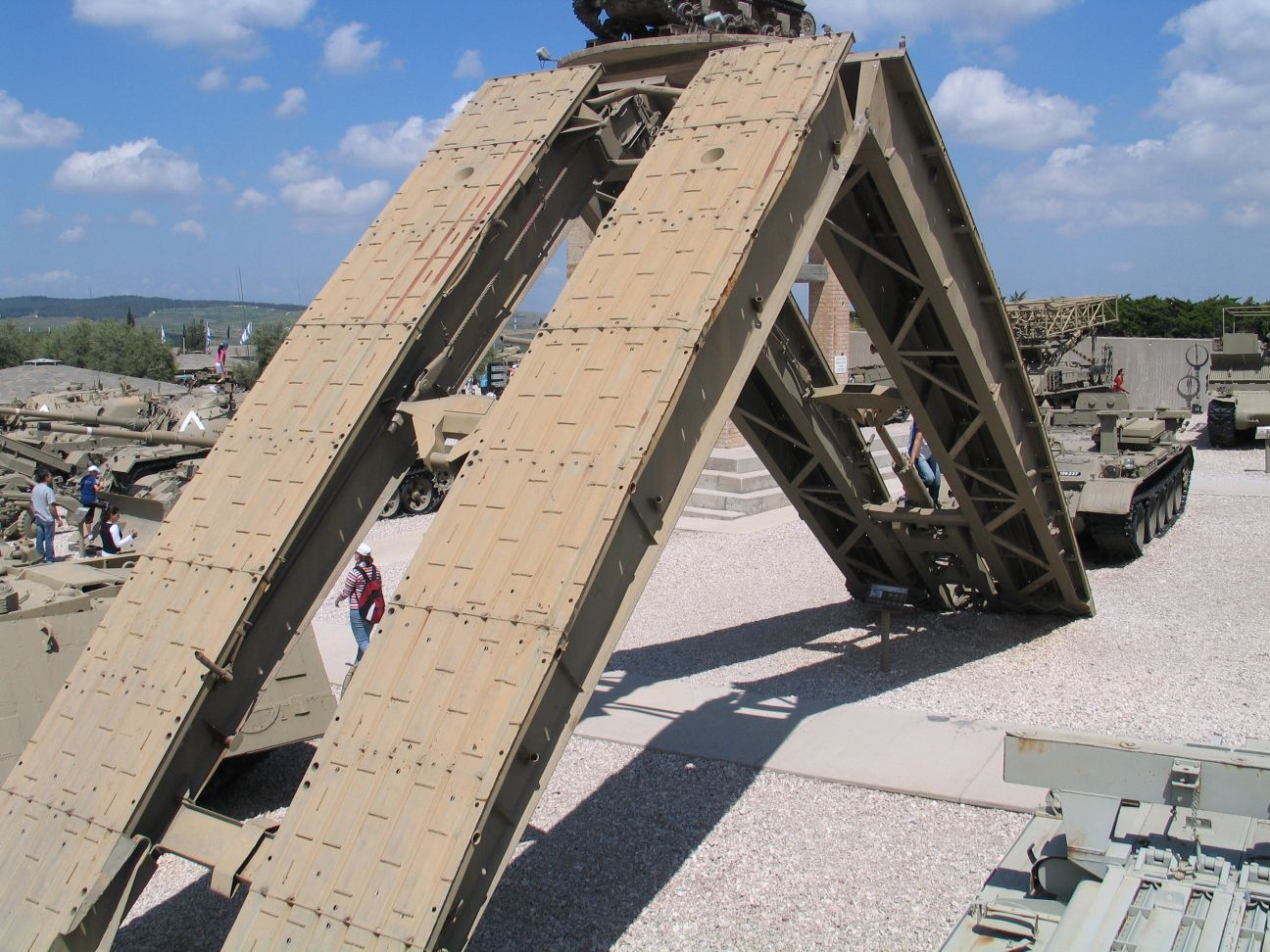
MT-55KS bridgelayer in Yad La-Shiryon Museum, Israel.

== See also ==
- Germany: Panzerschnellbrücke 2, based on the Leopard 2 MBT.
- Russia: MTU-72 AVLB, based on the T-72 MBT.
- M60A1 AVLB, based on the M60 MBT
- BLG-60, based on T-55
