= RM-70 multiple rocket launcher =

Czechoslovak self-propelled multiple rocket launcher

RM-70
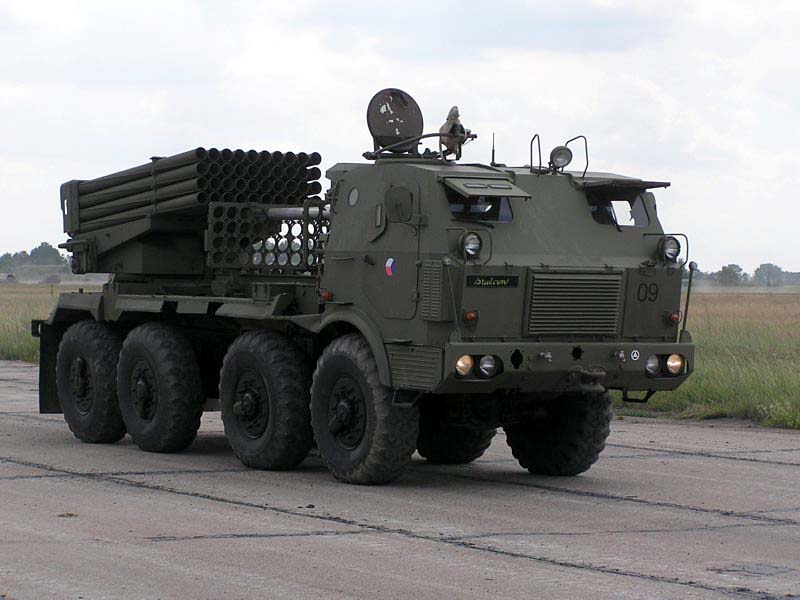
- RM-70 of the Czech Land Forces, mounted on Tatra 813 truck.
- Type: Self-propelled multiple rocket launcher
- Place of origin: Czechoslovakia

Service history
- In service: 1972–present
- Used by: See users
- Wars: Western Sahara War; Russo-Georgian War; Sri Lankan Civil War; First Libyan Civil War; Afghanistan conflict (1978–present); 2013 Kivu Offensive; Yemeni Civil War (2014–present); 2020 Nagorno-Karabakh war Russian invasion of Ukraine; 2025 Cambodia‒Thailand conflict

Specifications
- Mass: 33.7 tonnes (74,295 lb)
- Length: 8.75 m (28 ft 8 in)
- Width: 2.5 m (8 ft 2 in)
- Height: 2.7 m (8 ft 10 in)
- Crew: 6
- Caliber: 122.4 mm (4.8 in)
- Barrels: 40
- Maximum firing range: 40 km (25 mi)
- Armor: Steel
- Secondary armament: Universal machine gun vz. 59
- Engine: T-903-3 V12 multi-fuel 250 hp (184 kW)
- Suspension: 8×8 wheeled
- Operational range: 400 km (250 mi)
- Maximum speed: 85 km/h (53 mph)

The RM-70 (Czech: Raketomet vzor 70, lit. 'Rocket-launcher model 70') multiple rocket launcher is a multiple rocket launcher, providing enhanced performance over its parent area-saturation rocket artillery system that was introduced in 1971 (the NATO designation is M1972).

== Development ==
=== Soviet rocket-launchers ===
In 1963, the Soviet Army introduced its BM-21 Grad 122 mm multiple rocket launcher. It was presented to the Czechoslovak military delegation in the beginning of summer 1964 in Moscow. After their return, they suggested the replacement of the RM-51 in the form of the BM-21 Grad. After consultations with both parties, Czechoslovakia received the license to produce the BM-21 Grad domestically. In April 1966, the decision was made to develop a rocket launcher for the needs of the Czechoslovak People's Army. A month later, the requirements for the system were outlined: the system had to be installed on an armored Tatra 813 truck.

=== Czechoslovak development ===
Development and the construction of a prototype was awarded to Konštrukta Trenčín. Konštrukta Trenčín completed the integration and the first prototype in spring of 1967. From September 1967 to December 1969, the vehicle underwent company and military testing. During testing, the prototype drove a total of 25,000 kilometers, fired around 500 rockets, during which the loading mechanism completed 120 loading cycles without any issues. Following the positive results from testing, the Ministry of Defence approved the commissioning of the vehicle in the Czechoslovak People's Army under the designation 122 mm raketomet vz. 70 (122 mm rocket-launcher model 70). At the same time, approval for the production of the first batch of 30 vehicles was given to ZTS Dubnica nad Váhom was given.

Four vehicles from the first 10 of the batch of 30 passed secondary testing as well, which occurred from November 1970 to March 1971. In the summer months of 1971, two vz. 70 vehicles were tested in the Soviet Union, with the vehicle being very positively rated.

Towards the end of 1971, serial production was launched and around 430 rocket RM-70 rocket launchers were produced for the Czechoslovak People's Army.

== Description ==
RM-70 replaced the Ural-375D 6x6 truck by a Tatra T813 "Kolos" 8x8 truck as carrier platform for the 40-round launcher. The new carrier vehicle provides enough space for carrying 40 additional 122 mm rockets pack for automatic reload. Nevertheless, RM-70 performance remains near the same as Grad even in terms of vehicle's speed and range.

The rocket launcher can fire both individual rounds and volleys, principally by means of indirect fire. It is designed for concentrated fire coverage of large areas (up to 3 hectares (30,000 m^{2}) in one volley) by high explosive fragmentation shells. The fire is robust with almost 256 kg of explosives used in one volley of 40 rockets. The rockets used are either the original Soviet 9M22 and 9M28, or locally developed models. These are the JROF with a range of 20.75 km, the JROF-K with a range of 11 km, the "Trnovnik" with 63 HEAT-bomblets and a range of 17.5 km, the "Kuš" with five PPMI-S1 anti-personnel mines or the "Krizhna-R" with four PTMI-D anti-tank mines and a range of 19.45 km. Ukraine has also used the RM-70 to fire Serbian G-2000 rockets with a range of 40.5 km. RM-70 systems have been used by Ukraine to attack the Russian city of Belgorod.

The vehicle is provided with a central tyre pressure regulation system (to allow its adaptation to the nature of the traversed ground), a headlight with white light on the forward cab roof and, if necessary, with a snow plough SSP 1000 or a dozer blade BZ-T to arrange its own emplacement or to remove obstacles.

== Variants ==
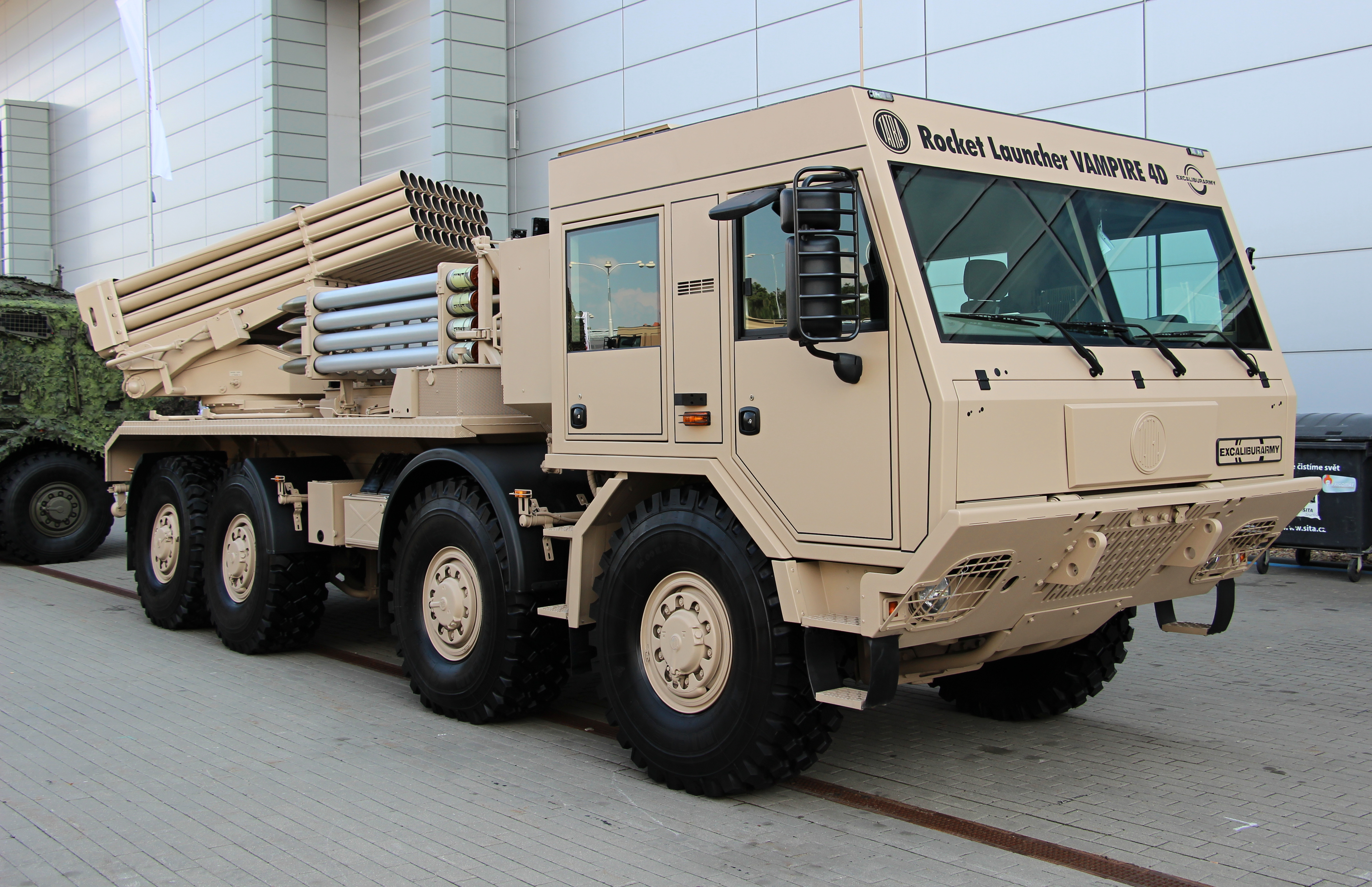
RM-70 Vampire 4D

=== Czechoslovak production variants ===
==== vz. 70 (RM-70) ====
- Basic model, as described.

==== vz. 70/85 (RM-70/85) ====
Unarmored version of the RM-70, based on the Tatra T815 VPR9 8x8.1R truck with 265 hp engine T3-930-51. Apart from a different chassis, the modernization also included the installation of a navigational and diagnostical system. It's combat weight was 26.1 tons, and is sometimes confused with the Slovak modernization RM 70/85M.

=== Slovak modernizations ===
==== RM-70/85M ====
A modernized vz. 70/85 with a new fire control system, navigation equipment, can use a new type of rocket with a range of 36 km. Slovakia has ordered 50 upgrade packages.

==== RM-70 Modular ====
In December 2000, the Slovak Ministry of Defense and Delta Defence started the RM-70 Modular German-Slovak modernization project. RM-70 Modular allows this artillery system to launch either twenty-eight 122 mm rockets, or six 227 mm rockets as used on the M270 MLRS. This way the system became fully NATO-compatible. The truck cabin is entirely armored. The Slovak Republic signed for 26 upgraded artillery systems with the first one delivered on May 20, 2005. RM-70 Modular is being offered as an upgrade for RM-70 owners.

=== Czech modernizations ===
==== RM-70 Vampire ====
Upgraded version with digital fire control. Tatra 817 truck chassis powered by a Tatra T3C V8 engine with 270 kW of output, coupled with a Tatra 10 TS 210 N gearbox, with semi-automatic Tatra Norgen drive system and an additional gearbox Tatra 2.30TRS. It has a range of around 1,000 km (620 mi) and a top speed of 90 km/h (56 mph) with an armored and NBC-protected crew cabin. Another modernization designated RM-70 Vampire 4D is very similar, with the only difference being it has a four-door cabin instead of the original two-door cabin.

=== Similar and related vehicles ===
==== Vz.92 "Križan" VMZ ====
The VMZ stands for (Czech: velkokapacitní mobilní zatarasovač, lit. 'High-capacity mobile mine-layer') - Engineer vehicle, based on the Tatra T815 36.265 with a lightly armoured cabin. The vehicle comes in different configurations, the standard being a 40-round rocket launcher (for "Kuš" and "Krizhna-R" rockets), a mechanical mine layer for anti-tank mines (PT Mi-U or PT Mi-Ba-III) and two dispensers for anti-personnel mines (PP Mi-S1).

== Operators ==
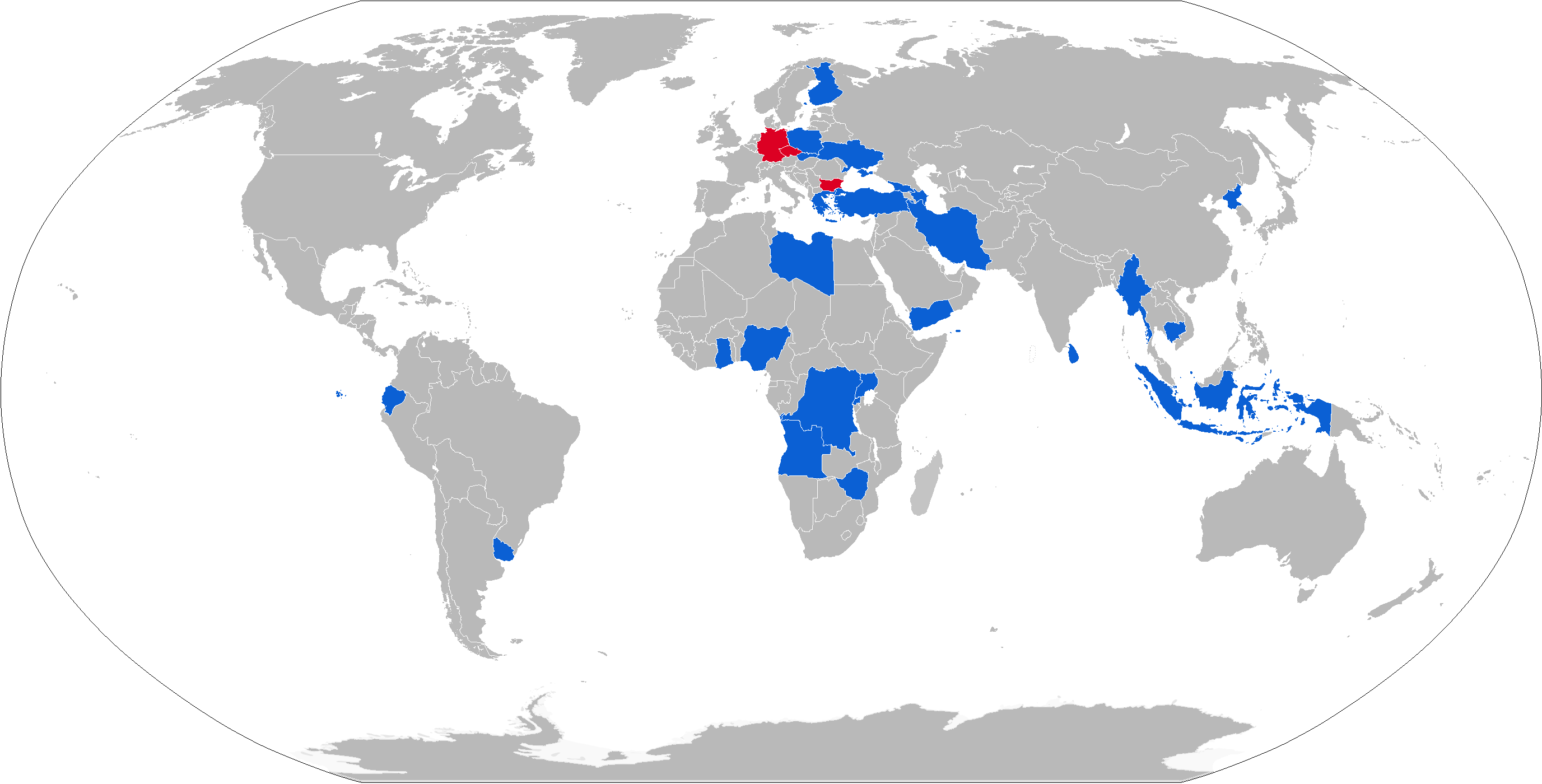
Operators: Current Former

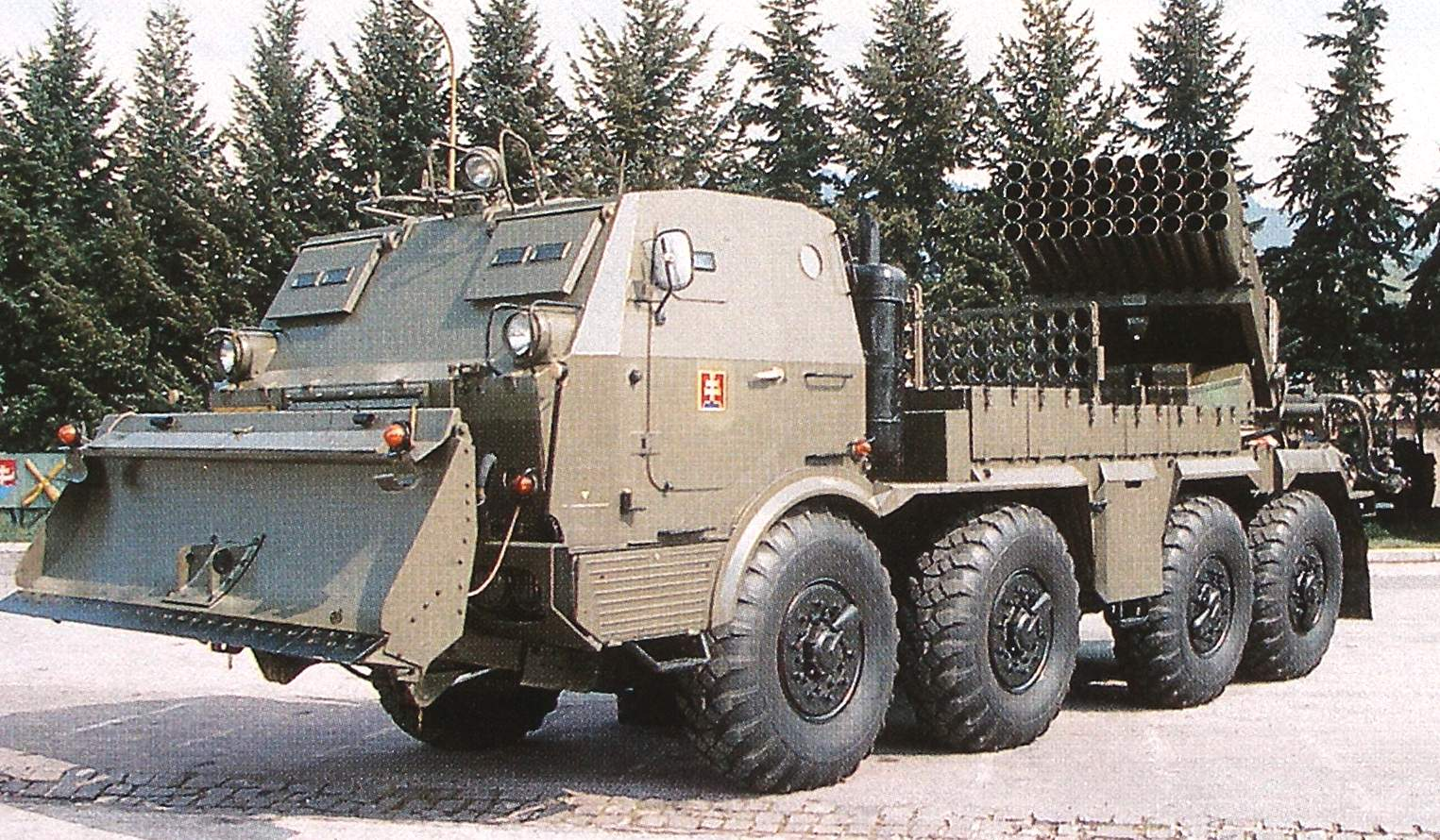
RM-70 Slovak army.

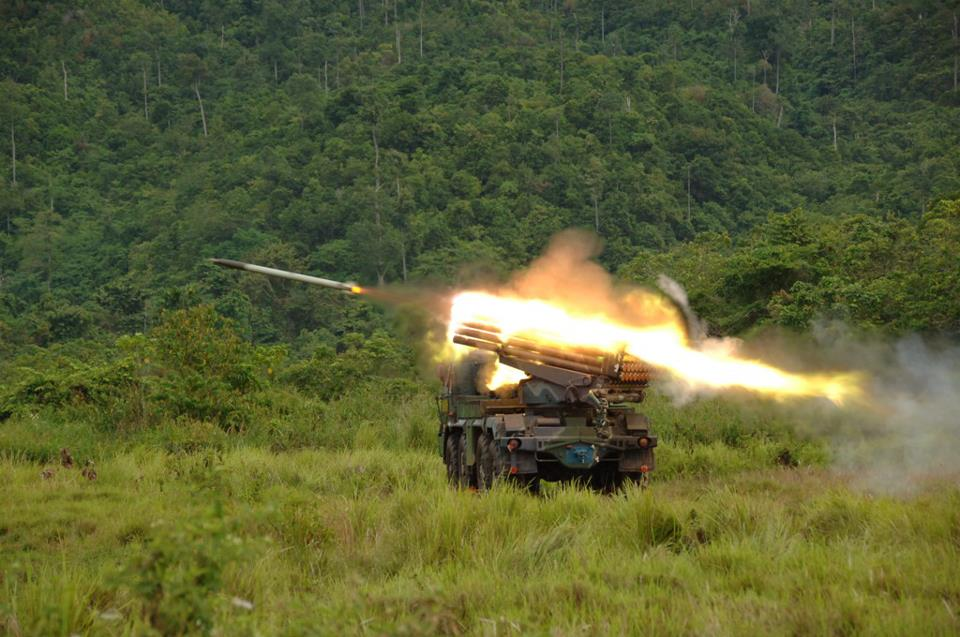
Indonesian Korps Marinir RM-70 unit firing.

=== Current operators ===
- Angola − 40 as of 2023.
- Azerbaijan − 18 RM-70 Vampire as of 2023.
- Cambodia − In active service. 20 RM-70 as of 2023.
- Democratic Republic of the Congo
- Ecuador − 6 as of 2024.
- Finland − 34 RM-70 as of 2023.
- Georgia − 18 RM-70 as of 2023.
- Greece − 108 RM-70 as of 2023.
- Indonesia − 9 RM-70 Grad and 36 RM-70 Vampire used as of 2023. Used by the Marine Corps.
- Nigeria − 7 RM-70 as of 2023.
- North Korea − Unknown number purchased from second-hand sources during the Cold War and domestically produced
- Poland − 29 RM-70 as of 2023.
- Rwanda − 5 as of 2023.
- Sahrawi Republic
- Slovakia − 4 RM-70 and 26 RM-70/85 Modular as of 2023.
- Serbia − 30 RM-70 Vampire
- Sri Lanka − Unknown number in service 2026.
- Turkmenistan
- Uganda − 6 as of 2023.
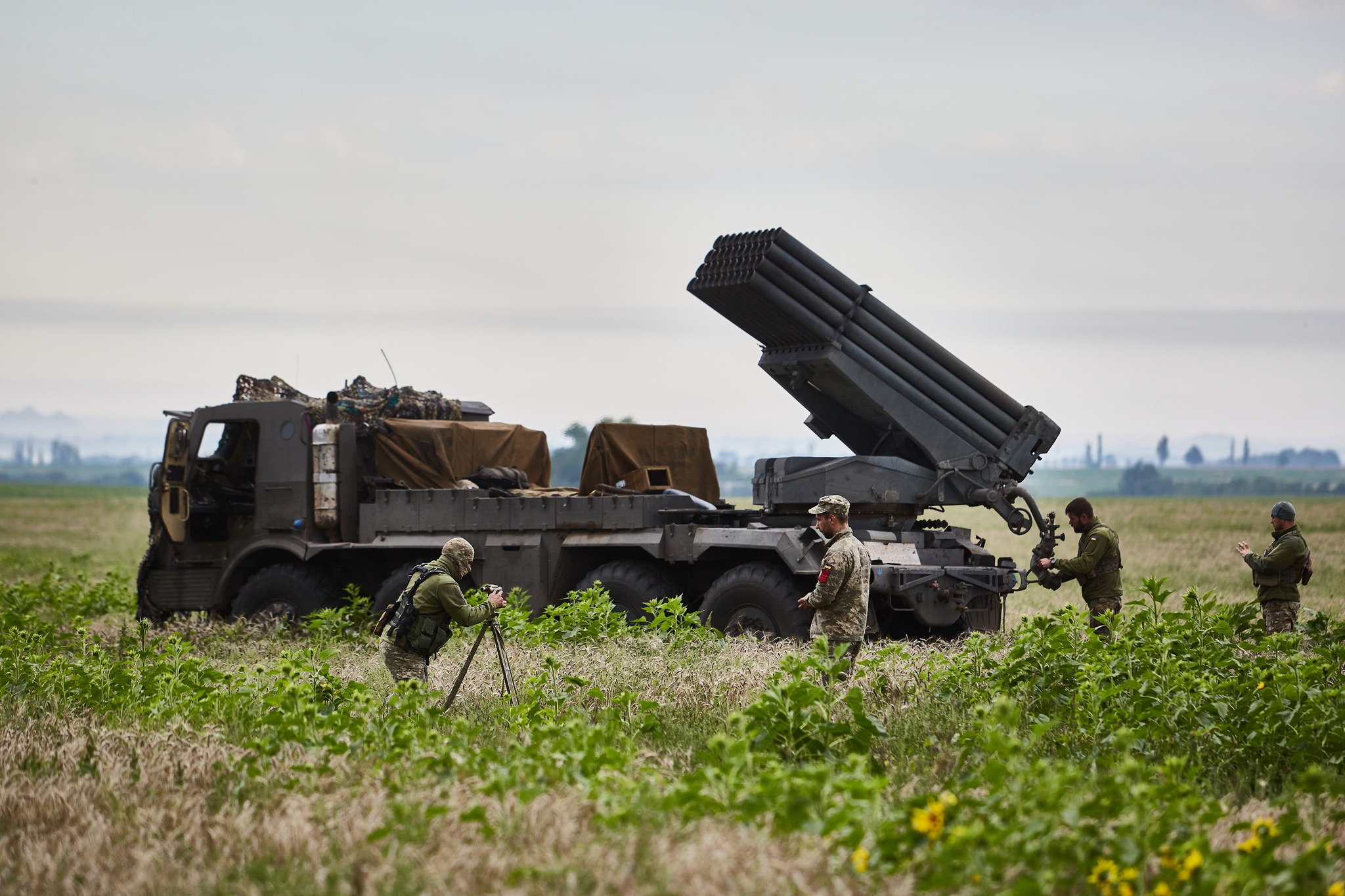
- Ukrainian Army RM-70
  Ukraine − 20 RM-70 Vampire as of 2023 At least 5 destroyed or damaged as of April 27th 2025.
- Uruguay
- Zimbabwe − 60 RM-70 as of 2023.

=== Former operators ===
- Bulgaria − 12 imported in 2009 (re-export, not commissioned in the Bulgarian Army)
- Czech Republic − 60 RM-70 (decommissioned as of end of 2011 without replacement)
- Czechoslovakia − Passed on to the Czech Republic and Slovakia after its dissolution.
- East Germany − 265 RM-70 received between 1975 and 1989; 158 delivered to Greece after the collapse of East Germany and 36 sold to Finland in 1991
- Germany − Inherited from East Germany, donated to Greece.
- Libya − 36 (delivered by Czechoslovakia between 1981 and 1982). Estimated 100 RM-70 in service prior to the 2011 Libyan civil war

=== Unknown operational status ===
- Algeria – Unknown number observed at Mers Al-Kebir Naval Base in the early 1980s. Operational status unknown.

== See also ==
- BM-21 Grad – (Soviet Union)
- WR-40 Langusta – (Poland)
- M-77 Oganj – (Yugoslavia)
- T-122 Sakarya – (Turkey)
- Fajr-5 – (Iran)
- RS-122 – (Georgia)

== Bibliography ==
- International Institute for Strategic Studies (15 February 2023). The Military Balance 2023 (1st ed.). Routledge. pp. 201−204. ISBN 978-1032508955.
