= Dave Carden =

New Zealand engineer (born 1930)

Dave Carden (born 13 September 1930) is a New Zealand engineer, inventor, and businessman in the New Zealand heavy transport and crane industries. He was a co-founder and long-time owner of Tidd Ross Todd (TRT), based in Hamilton, and introduced several transport engineering innovations over his career.

Carden's contributions include the development of the TIDD Crane Carrier and the TractionAir Central Tyre Inflation (CTI) system, as well as a decision known as "the Game Changer" that impacted the New Zealand crane market. He was inducted into the New Zealand Road Transport Hall of Fame in 2017.

== Early life ==
Carden was born in Paeroa, Waikato, on 13 September 1930. He began a fitter and turner apprenticeship with A&G Price in Thames aged 17, later transferring to specialize in precision welding at Putaruru Engineering.

== Career ==
Following his registration as a fitter turner and welder, he worked offshore as a marine engineer, before returning to the Waikato region to work in various mechanical roles.

In 1958, Carden founded a general engineering business, Southside Motor Engineering, in Putaruru. He gained a reputation for finding domestic workarounds to customer problems caused by the import restrictions applied to the New Zealand economy. His work during this period included specialized engineering on the Putaruru Rail Bridge in 1965.

=== Tidd Ross Todd ===
In 1967, Carden merged Southside Motor Engineering with Jack Tidd and Ross Todd Motors to form Jack Tidd Ross Todd Ltd (JTRT), the only crane carrier manufacturer in New Zealand. Carden joined as a one-third shareholder and the workshop manager.

Following the death of Jack Tidd in 1975, Dave and his wife Jenny acquired Tidd's shares. In 1987, Carden bought out Norm Todd's remaining shares, making the Carden family the sole owners of the company, which was subsequently rebranded to Tidd Ross Todd (TRT). Carden was the company's managing director from 1987 to 1997, overseeing its expansion into Australia in the late 1990s.

He stepped down as a director in 2021, taking a new role as a TRT Ambassador. The company is now led by his sons, Bruce and Robert Carden.

== Key innovations ==
Carden's work focused on developing heavy transport and lifting solutions tailored for New Zealand and Australian conditions. Major engineering projects and innovations credited to him and his design office include:

- 1970 - Kaimai Tunnel Beams: Carden devised and built the machinery required to bend the steel support beams for the 8.8 km Kaimai Railway Tunnel, producing 8,000 beams over the eight-year project.
- 1970 - TIDD Logging Jinkers: Developed specialized transport carriers for the forestry industry.
- 1976 - TIDD Crane Carrier: TRT produced 207 of these crane carriers, which Carden built mostly from scratch using domestic resources, rather than assembling imported components.
- 1982 - Tidd Hydrasteer: A notable innovation in transport steering technology.
- 1988 - Hydraulic House Mover: A system developed for moving residential structures.
- 1998 - TractionAir® CTI: The development of the central tire inflation system, now a key product for TRT, designed to improve heavy transport safety and efficiency.

=== "The Game Changer" ===
In 1982, at the New Zealand Crane Conference, Carden publicly relinquished his company's right to the Import Duty Protection License for fully built-up cranes by signing a paper napkin. This act has a significant effect on the New Zealand crane industry, as the license had provided a protective economic advantage, allowing domestic manufacturers to set market prices. Carden's action opened the market to cheaper imported cranes, acknowledging that the protected domestic product was becoming uncompetitive by world standards. This move became known as "the Game Changer", and has been cited by industry peers as an act of principled business leadership.

== Awards ==
Carden was inducted into the New Zealand Road Transport Hall of Fame in 2017, in honour of his contribution to the heavy transport and crane industries in New Zealand.

== Personal life ==
Carden has been a volunteer for the local Lions Club, and a member of the board of St Paul's Collegiate School in Hamilton.
