= Tatrapan =

Slovak armoured vehicle

TATRAPAN
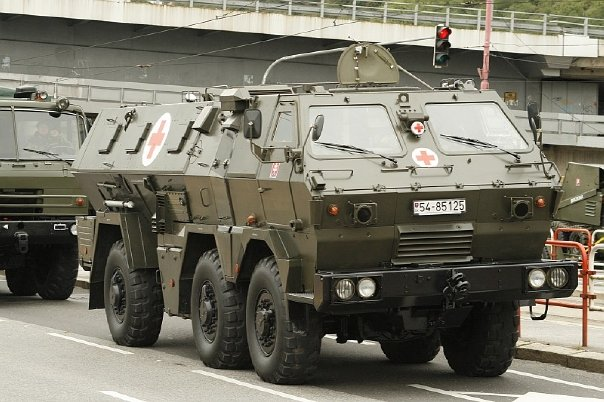
- TATRAPAN AMB of the Slovak Armed Forces
- Place of origin: Slovakia

Specifications
- Mass: up to 24,000 kg (53,000 lb)
- Length: 8.4 m (28 ft)
- Width: 2.5 m (8 ft 2 in)
- Height: 2.7 m (8 ft 10 in)
- Crew: 2-3 (commander, driver, optional gunner) up to 10 passengers
- Armor: 7.62 AP
- Main armament: 7.62 or 12.7 machinegun
- Engine: Tatra or Deutz; 275 kW (369 hp) or 300 kW (400 hp)
- Suspension: 6×6 wheeled independent semiaxles
- Operational range: 1,000 km (620 mi)
- Maximum speed: over 90 km/h (60 mph)

The TATRAPAN is a 6x6 special military vehicle produced by the Slovak defence industry company VYVOJ Martin. It was developed for various uses, primarily for the Slovak Armed Forces as well as for export purposes.

== Design ==
The TATRAPAN is an armoured off-road vehicle built on the military version of the Tatra 815 chassis. The vehicle has a cab for a driver and a commander of the vehicle and a superstructure body which can be modified and equipped for various applications. The superstructure body is designed as an autonomous unit and its crew can work independently also as a permanent autonomous station. Quick release clamps with centering pins provide a means for fastening the body, thus enabling application of various bodies on a single chassis. Maximum time required to replace a body is 60 minutes.

A specially constructed V-shaped bottom provides increased protection against mine explosions.

== Versions ==
The TATRAPAN has over 10 different variants, some of which are prototypes, but there are 2 variants that serve as the basis for all other variants, the T1/Z1 and the VESPRA.

=== TATRAPAN T1/Z1 ===
A basic transport variant of the TATRAPAN, the crew consists of two, the driver and commander, and the vehicle can carry 10-12 passengers. It's armed with one 7.62 mm PKT machine gun mounted above the commander's place, and one 12.7 mm NSV machine gun mounted on the roof of the rear section.

==== TATRAPAN ZASA ====
The TATRAPAN ZASA, short for: Západná Sahara, (Western Sahara), is a modified variant of the TATRAPAN T1/Z1. Development on the ZASA began in 1998, with the mission of the vehicle being peacekeeping (either for the EU, NATO, or the UN) specifically in difficult conditions. The Slovak Armed Forces received the first three vehicles in 1998.

==== TATRAPAN AMB ====
The TATRAPAN AMB (AMB is short for Ambulancia which is Slovak for ambulance) is an ambulance/medical variant of the TATRAPAN. The basis for the AMB variant was the ZASA variant and therefore the vehicles are very similar in their appearance. Differences between the two include, the missing left door and openings for the infantry weapons and as a medical/ambulance variant, the external machine guns were removed. The passenger cabin was adapted to either transport four patients that were lying down or eight that were seated. Two prototypes and an unknown number of production vehicles were built and they were deployed in the United Nations Mission in Ethiopia and Eritrea.

=== TATRAPAN VESPRA ===
The TATRAPAN VESPRA is the second major variant of the TATRAPAN from which many other command and control variants were developed. Development of the VESPRA concluded in 1993 with the end of military testing of the vehicle. The vehicle is armed exactly like the T1/Z1 variant, with a 7.62 mm PKT machine gun mounted above the commander's place, and a 12.7 mm NSV machine gun mounted in a little station on the roof along the rear of the vehicle. The vehicle served as a command post with seven crewmembers, two in the driver's cabin and five in the rear cabin.

== Service ==
The first Tatrapan prototype entered service in 1994. Until 2009, there were about 50 vehicles produced for the Slovak Armed Forces and the Cypriot National Guard.

== Operators ==
- Slovakia: 70+
- Cyprus: small number
- Indonesia: Marine Corps

== See also ==
- Sisu Pasi
