= Tatra 813 =

Czech truck family

T 813
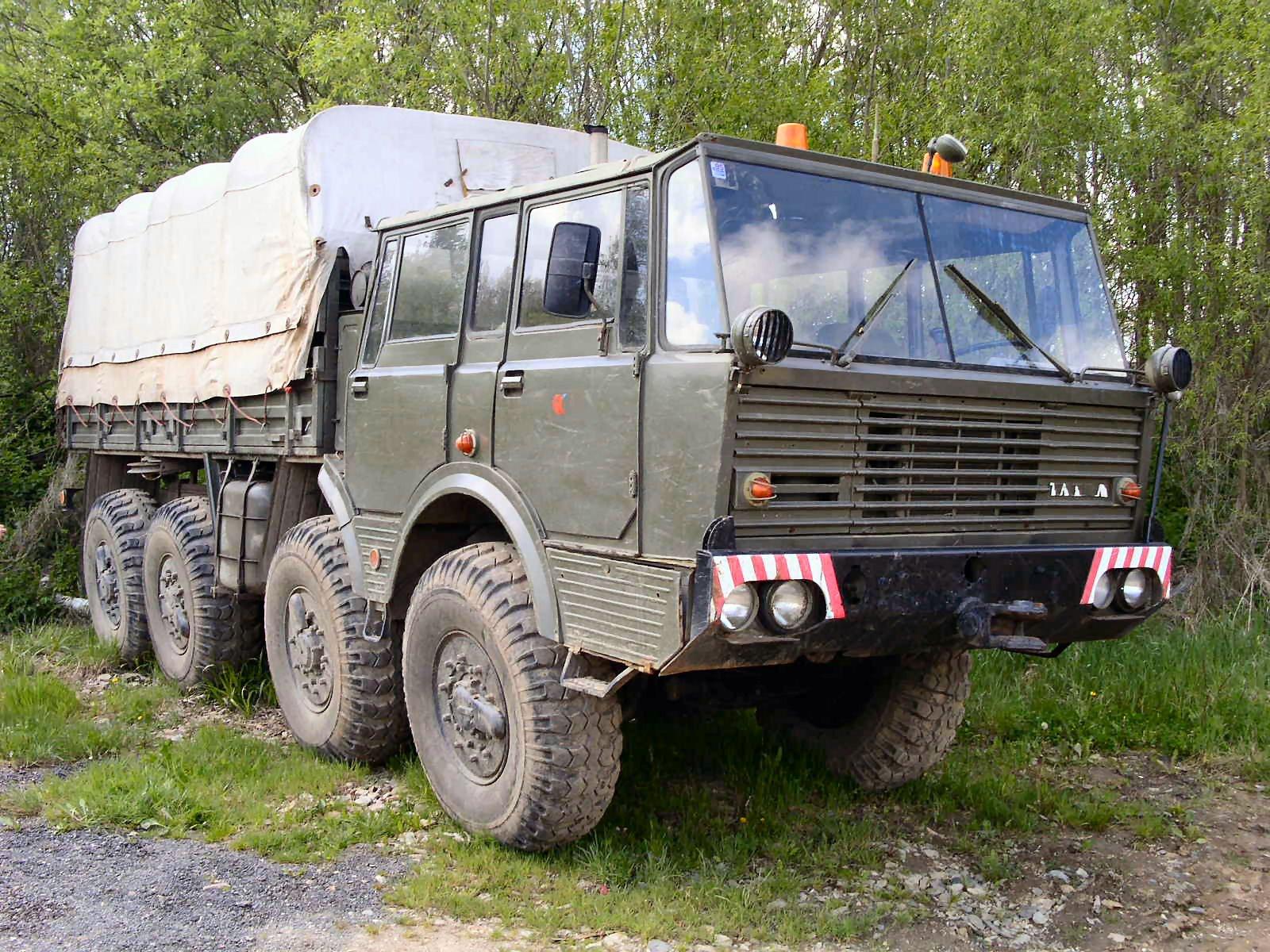

Overview
- Manufacturer: Tatra
- Production: 1967-1982

Body and chassis
- Body style: COE

Powertrain
- Engine: V12 Diesel

Dimensions
- Length: 8,800 mm (346.5 in) (T813 KOLOS)
- Width: 2,500 mm (98.4 in)
- Height: 2,780 mm (109.4 in) (T813 KOLOS)
- Curb weight: 14,000 kg (30,865 lb) (T813 KOLOS)

Chronology
- Predecessor: Tatra T141
- Successor: Tatra T815

T 930-xx E
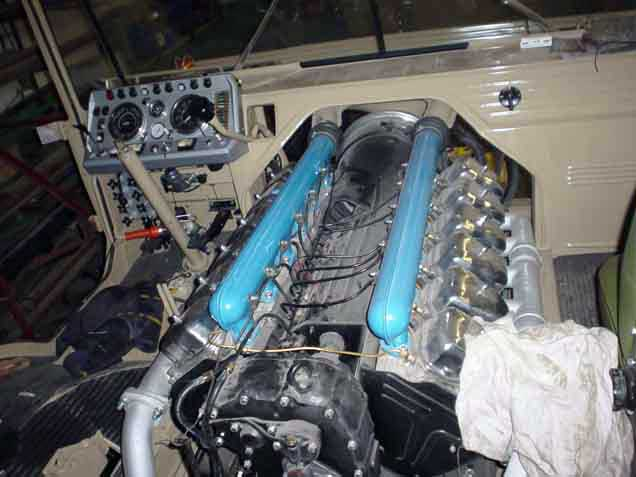

Overview
- Manufacturer: Tatra
- Also called: T 930 E

Layout
- Displacement: 17,640 cc
- Cylinder bore: 120 mm (4.7 in)
- Piston stroke: 130 mm (5.1 in)
- Cylinder block material: Cast Iron
- Cylinder head material: Aluminium alloy
- Valvetrain: OHV
- Compression ratio: 16.5:1

Combustion
- Fuel system: Direct injection
- Fuel type: multifuel
- Cooling system: Air-cooled

Output
- Power output: 198.6 kW (266 hp) @ 2000 rpm
- Torque output: 990 N⋅m (730 ft⋅lbf) @ 1300 rpm

Dimensions
- Dry weight: 1,035 kg (2,282 lb)

The Tatra T813 was a truck produced in Czechoslovakia by the Tatra company. It was produced from 1967 to 1982. The basic representative of this series was a military version of the 8×8 Kolos (Colossus), which was able to pull trailers up to a total weight of 100 tons. Tatra also produced a civilian version in either 6×6 or 4×4. After fifteen years of production, 11,751 vehicles were built in all modifications. Many units were exported to the USSR, East Germany, Romania and India.

== History ==
The prototype, made of Tatra 138 parts, was built in 1960. It had permanent 4×4 all-wheel-drive. After trials, the designers decided to develop and expand the concept to an 8×8 all-wheel-drive all-terrain vehicle. The basis of the design became the modular chassis of the Tatra 813. In 1983, it was succeeded by the Tatra T815.

== Design and technology ==
A tubular backbone construction was chosen for the T813. The advantages of the central load carrying backbone tube are the high torsional and bending stiffness protecting the truck's body from forces caused by the payload, plus it houses all important parts of the drivetrain and allows the modular construction so designers and customers can choose between two-, three-, and four-axle versions and wheelbase combinations. The T-813 design uses a cab-over-engine configuration, wide-profile super-single tires, and central tire inflation/deflation system.

=== Engine ===
The naturally aspirated V12 engine T-930 was created by adding four cylinders to the existing T-928 75° V8 engine of the Tatra T138 series. The crankshaft uses six individual journals bolted together with front and rear pins running on the main roller bearings on the axial friction thrust washers. The military version was multi-fuel capable, running on any mixture of diesel fuel, petrol/gasoline, and kerosene aviation fuel.

=== Chassis ===
T-813 uses a full-length backbone tube with modular independent-swinging half-axles available as either 4×4, 6×6, or 8×8. 4×4 models had a front axle suspension system with adjustable torsion bars, 6×6 and 8×8 models front and rear axles had longitudinal semi-elliptic leaf springs. 4×4 rear axle has air suspension. Permanent all-wheel-drive, front twin steer (6×6, 8×8) drive via homo-kinetic drive shafts, lockable differentials, inter-axle differentials with locks, and planetary hub reductions are standard for all models. Both the 6×6 and 8×8 versions use twin-steering front-axles and the 6×6 a single rear-axle.

- Front track
  - 2050 mm (KOLOS)
  - 1990 mm (6×6 Hauler, S1, 8×8 Chassis)
  - 2030 mm (NT, NTH Prime movers)
- Rear track
  - 2000 mm (8×8 KOLOS)
  - 1950 mm (6×6 Hauler, 8×8 Chassis, S 1)
  - 1990 mm (NT, NTH Prime movers)
- Wheelbase
  - T813 KOLOS - 1650+2200+1450 mm
  - 6×6 Hauler - 1650+2700 mm
  - 8×8 Chassis - 1650+3200+1450 mm
  - S1 8×8 - 1650+2800+1450 mm
  - NT, NTH 4×4 – 3700 mm
- Ground clearance
  - 380 mm (KOLOS, 6×6 Hauler)
  - 330 mm (8×8 Chassis, S1 8×8)
  - 300 mm (NT, NTH Prime Movers)

=== Transmission ===
The main gearbox is behind the cabin and connected to the engine clutch housing via a short cardan shaft (this design enables a 'flat-floor' cabin.) The main gearbox bolts to an auxiliary gearbox, to a transfer case, then to a backbone tube, and forms the main part of the chassis structure. A rear power take off and a winch drive were optional. Main and auxiliary gears are synchronized except first and reverse gear. The new feature was a unique 2-speed planetary overdrive system bolted between the front and rear axles. The overdrive could only be selected manually while the vehicle is stationary. The auxiliary gearbox has a neutral position so the winch and a power take-off use the main gearbox gearing for variable speed operation. From the backbone tube, torque flows to the wheels via Tatra gear differentials with differential locks, offset half-shafts, and planetary hub-reductions.

- Main gearbox - 5+1 (2-5 gear synchronized) (KOLOS 8×8 & Hauler 6×6)
  - gear ratios - (1)9.97, (2)4.96, (3)2.83, (4)1.68, (5)1.0, (R)8.58
- Main gearbox - 5+1 (2-5 gear synchronized) with splitter direct and overdrive (S1 8×8, Chassis 8×8, NT & NTH 4×4)
  - gear ratios - (1)9.97, (2)4.96, (3)2.83, (4)1.68, (5)1.0, (R)8.58
  - splitter ratios - 1.0 (Direct), 0.75 (Overdrive) (electro-pneumatic control via switch on the gear lever and clutch pedal activated )
- Auxiliary gearbox - 2-speed (electro-pneumatic control via switch on the gear lever and clutch pedal activated )
  - gear ratios - 2.2, 1.62 (KOLOS & Hauler 6×6)
- Step down transfer case - single
  - gear ratio - 1.68 (S1 8×8, Chassis 8×8, NT & NTH 4×4 only)
- Planetary overdrive
  - ratios - 1.0, 0.62 (KOLOS 8×8 & Hauler 6×6 only)
- Clutch - 3× plate dry (clutch-pedal hydraulic and air-power assisted)
  - - 2× plate dry (clutch-pedal hydraulic and air-power assisted) (NT & NTH 4×4 only)
- Differentials
  - 2× front and 2× rear (8×8 models)
  - 2× front and 1× rear (6×6 models)
  - 1× front and 1× rear (4×4 models)
  - final drive ratio - 2.71
- Planetary hub reduction ratios
  - 2.14 (KOLOS 8×8)
  - 2.12 (Hauler 6×6 & S1 8×8)

=== Brakes ===
Triple-circuit air "S" cam drum brakes acting on all wheels drums via slack adjuster, brake cylinders are remotely vented. First brake circuit acts on front wheels, the second on rear wheels, and the third controls trailer service brakes. Remote-mounted brake valve operates via hydraulic master-/slave-cylinder principle on the Hauler 6×6 or via mechanical linkage on 8×8 models.

Brake Specifications
Brake Function	Implementation
Primary brakes	Dual circuit drum brakes "S" cam type
Parking brake	Mechanical via output-shaft and drum at the back of the gearbox
Supplementary brake	electro-pneumatic, exhaust brake

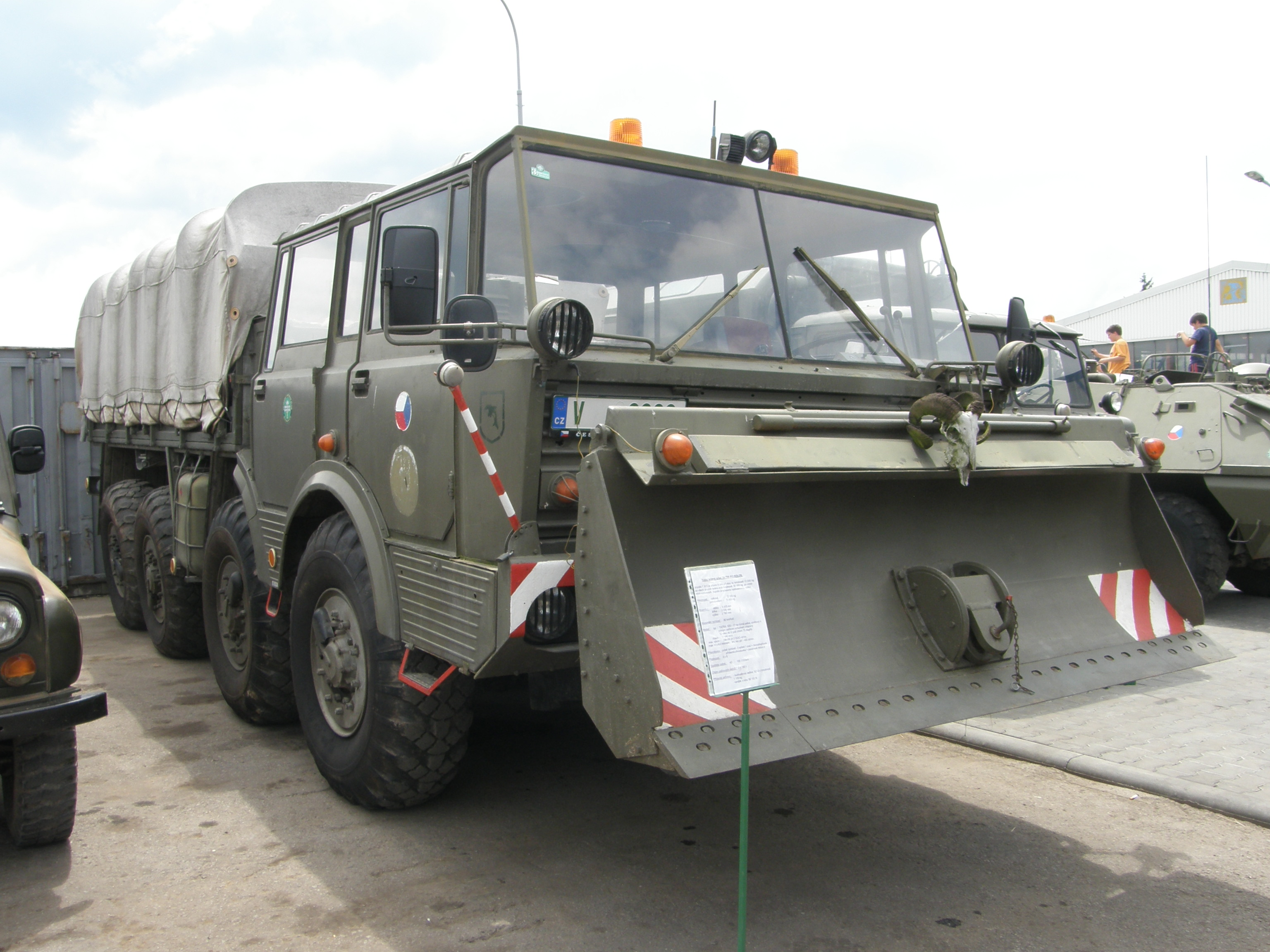
T813 KOLOS military specs with dozer blade

=== Bodywork ===
Cabin is all steel construction of COE design. It does not tilt; access to the engine is via removable engine cowlings inside the cabin. The cab is available in two-seater two-door version and "crew cab" seven-seater four-door. The military specs cabs include a roof hatch or two in the case of the crew-cab. All cabs use a self-contained diesel heater, and can be used to warm the engine before starting. Another military feature is CTI central tire inflation system controlled from the cab for each wheel independently, plus the cab-controlled ability to pressurize gearbox and differential housings prior to fording. The 8×8 models have the ability to cross trenches 1.4 meters wide and vertical obstacles 0.6 meters high. Fording depth (static including the wave) is 1.4 meters (KOLOS 8×8). The vehicle top speed is in the neighborhood of about 92 km/h (NT & NTH), 80 km/h (KOLOS), 70 km/h (hauler), 60 km/h (S1) at about 2000 engine rpm.

- Vehicles Weights

Tare - 14,000 kg (KOLOS 8×8), 21,050 kg (Hauler 6×6), 11,200 kg (Chassis 8×8), 15,000 kg (S1 8×8), 7,000 kg (NT & NTH 4×4)
GVM - 22,200 kg(KOLOS 8×8), 22,000 kg (Hauler 6×6), 36,000 kg (Chassis 8×8), 36,000 kg (S1 8×8),
Max Trailer Mass - 65,000 kg (KOLOS 8×8), 100,000 kg (Hauler 6×6), 32,000 kg (NT & NTH 4×4
GCM - 79,000 kg (KOLOS 8×8), 121,050 kg (Hauler 6×6), 39,000 kg (NT & NTH 4×4)

== Production ==
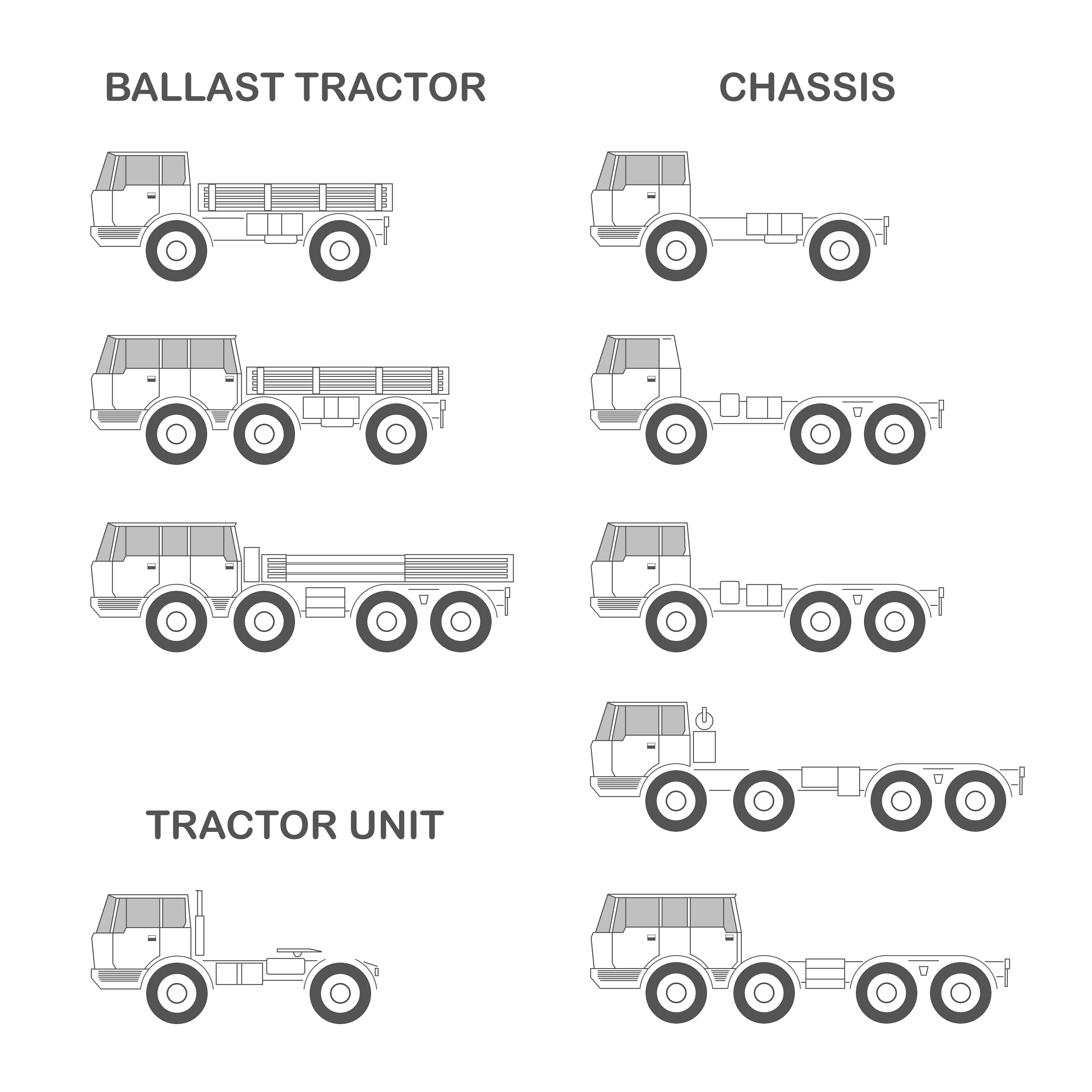
Tatra 813 produced types

Production of Tatra T813 began in 1967 and was superseded by Tatra T815 in 1982. Models were available in the 4×4, 6×6, and 8×8 drive configurations for civilian and military use.

  - Primary models
- Tatra T813 "KOLOS" 8×8 - Military heavy haulage
- Tatra T813 Hauler 6×6 - Civilian heavy haulage
- Tatra T813 S1 8×8 - Heavy one way tipper
- Tatra T813 Cab-chassis 8×8 - Coach builders' chassis for special use
- Tatra T813 NT & NTH 4×4 - Prime movers and special applications
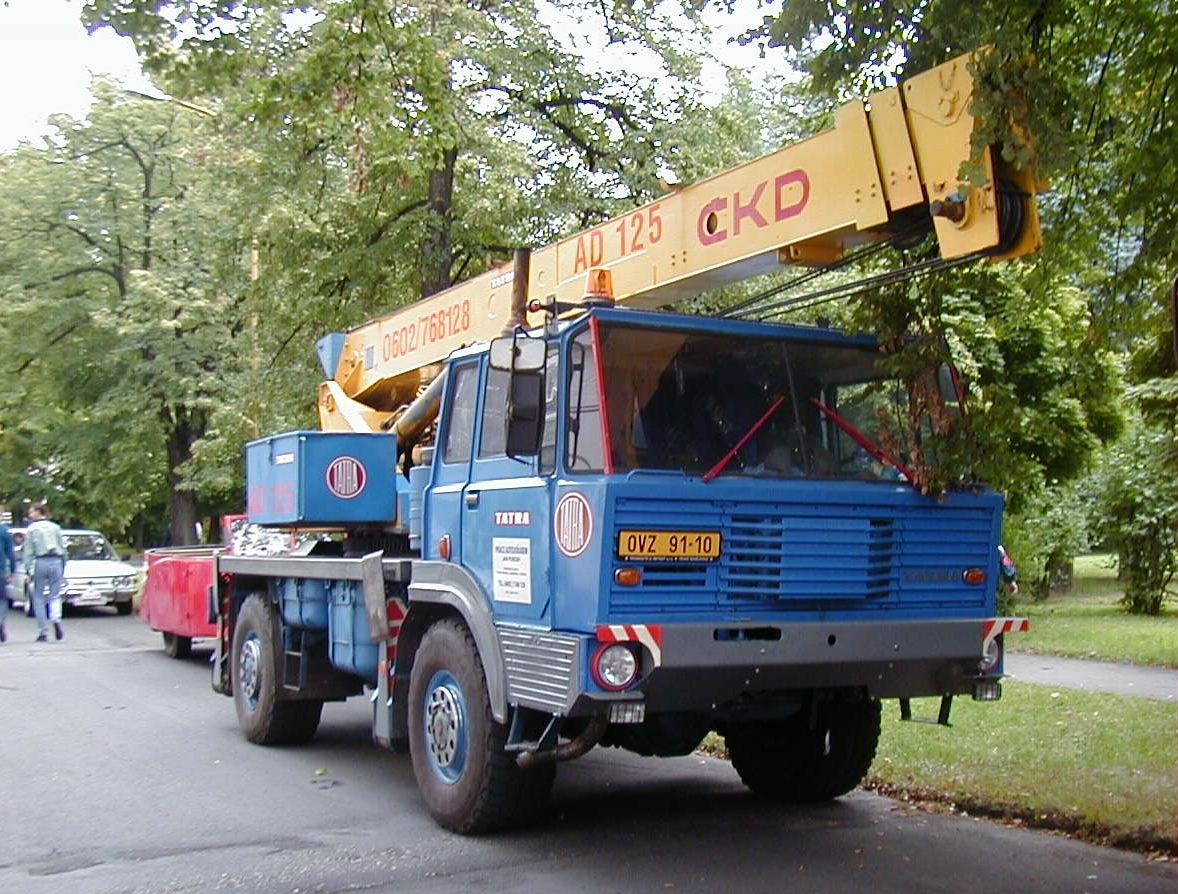
Crane 4×4

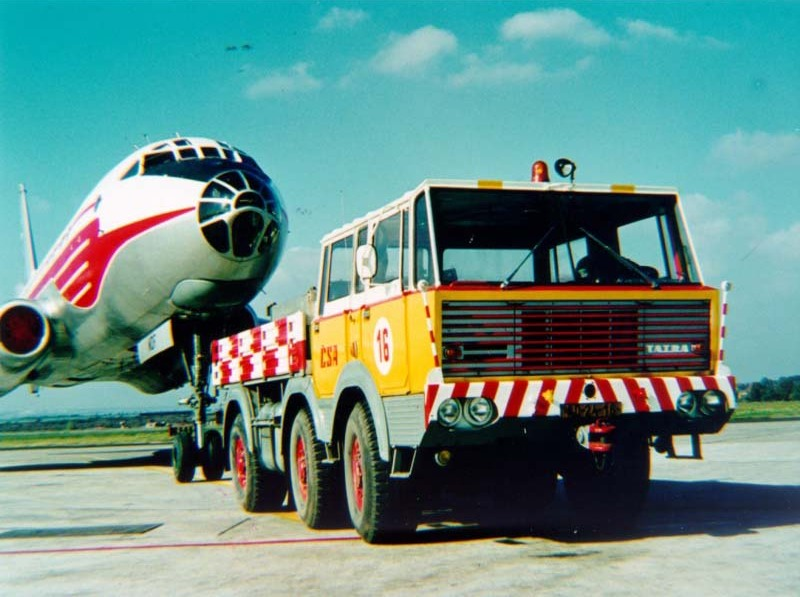
Airport tug T813 6×6 with Tu-104

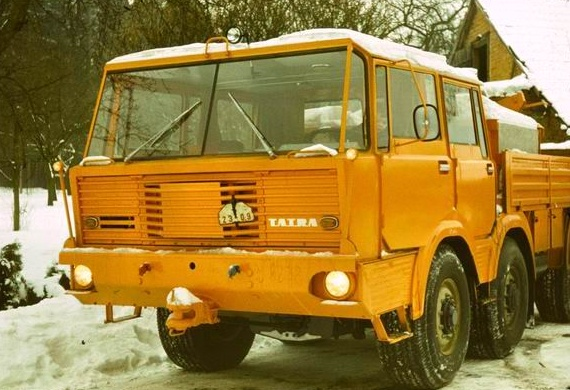
T813 Hauler

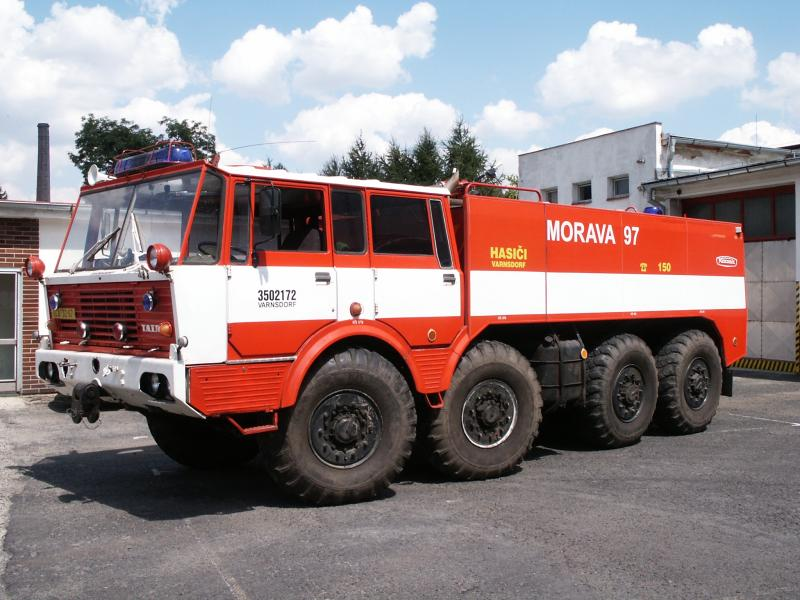
Fire 8×8

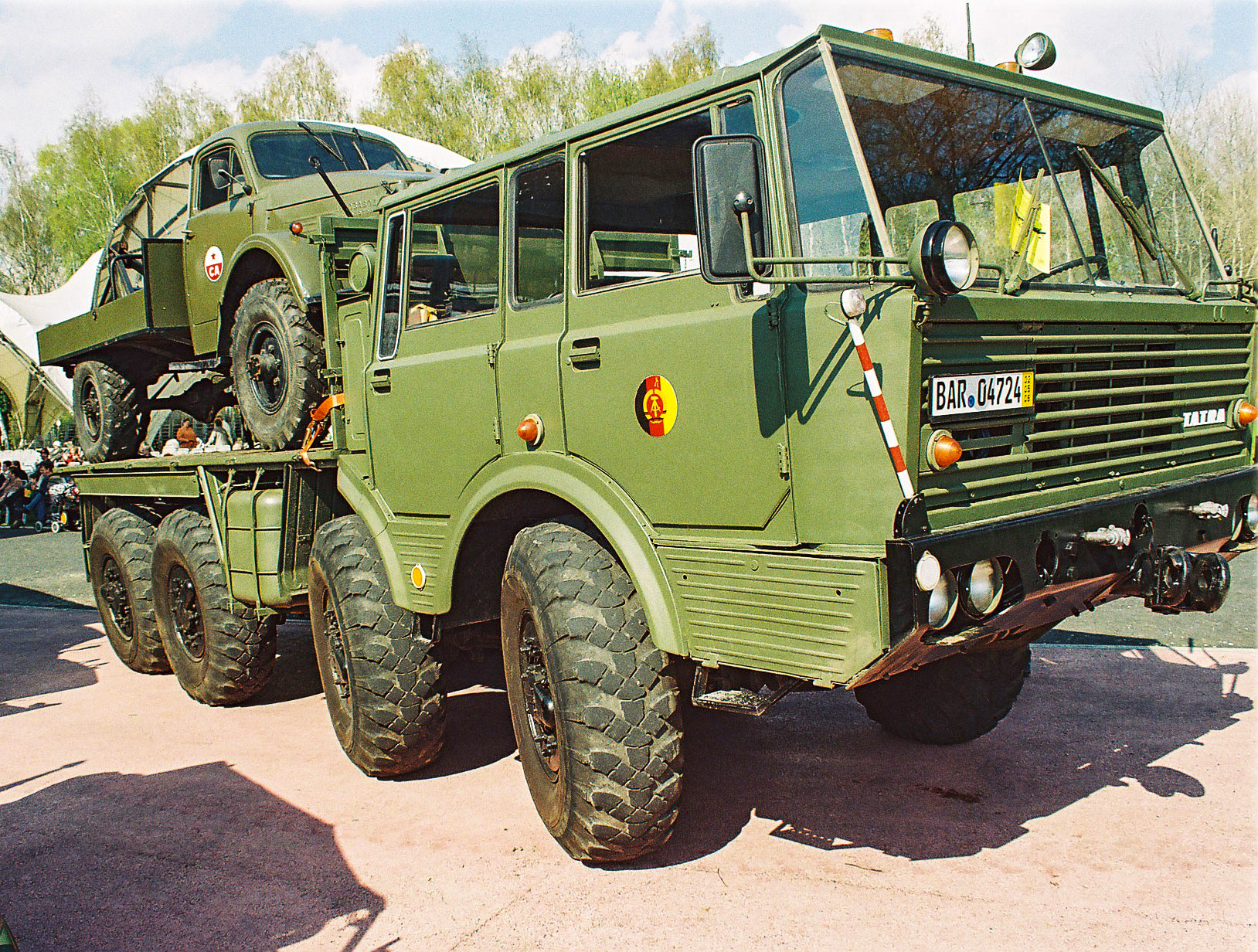
KOLOS 8×8 with GAZ-63

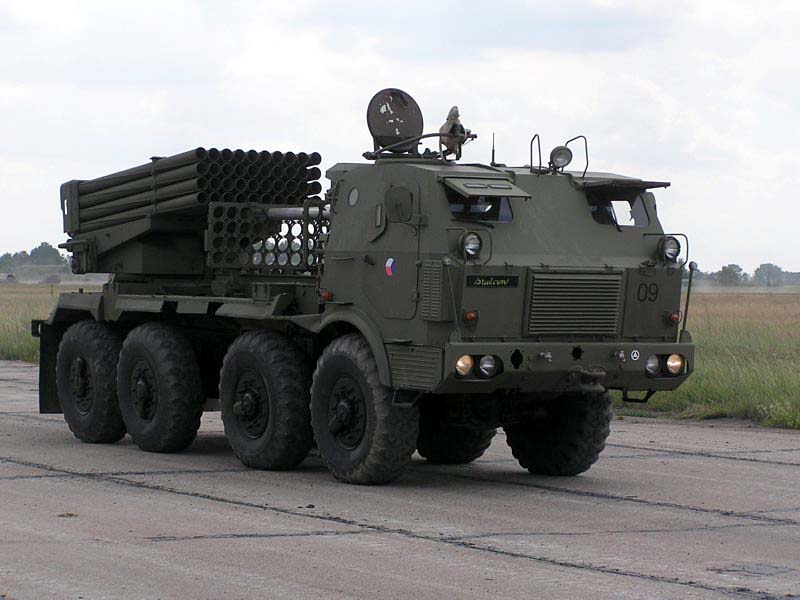
T813 Rocket launcher chassis RM70

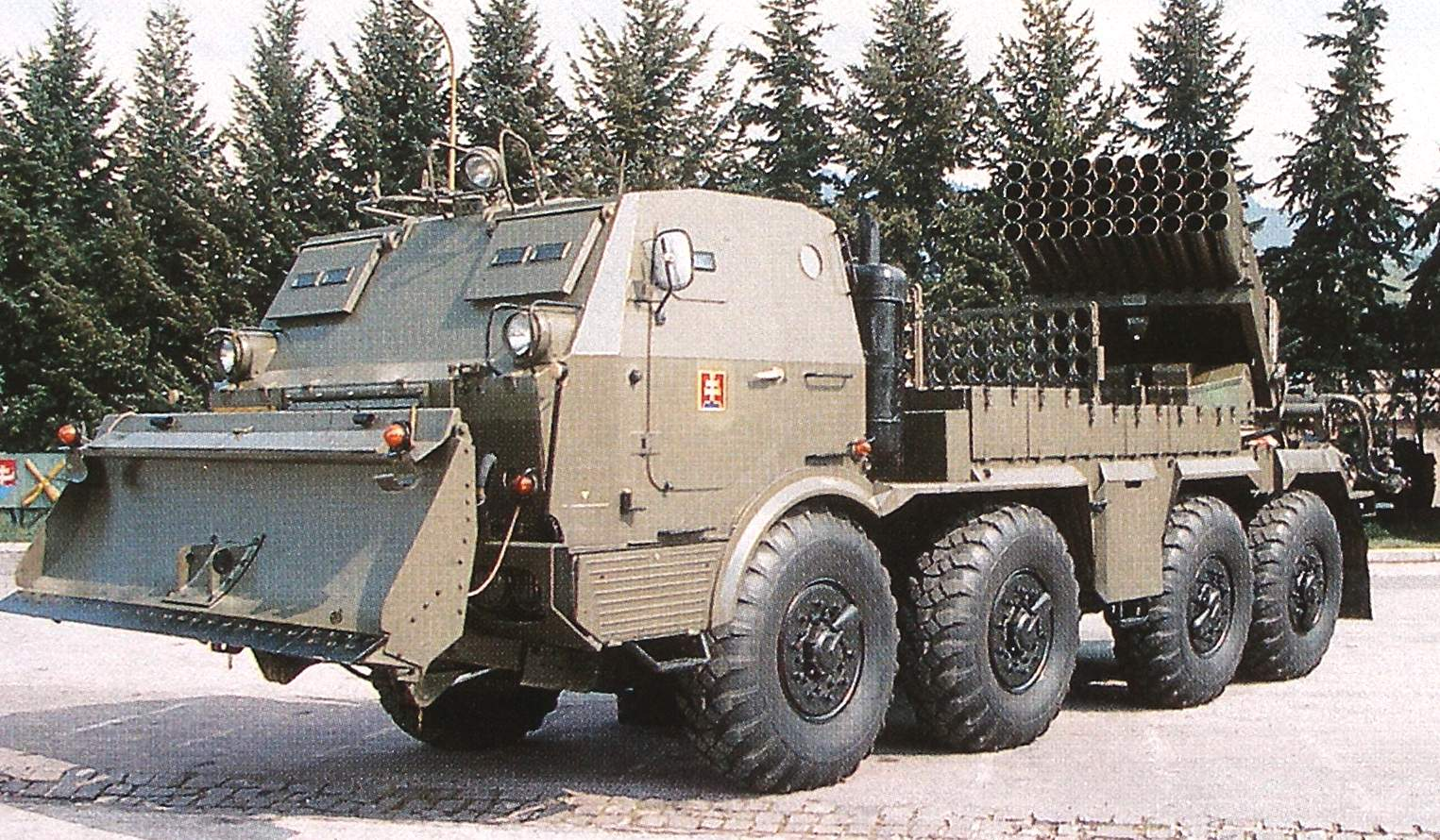
RM-70 MRL

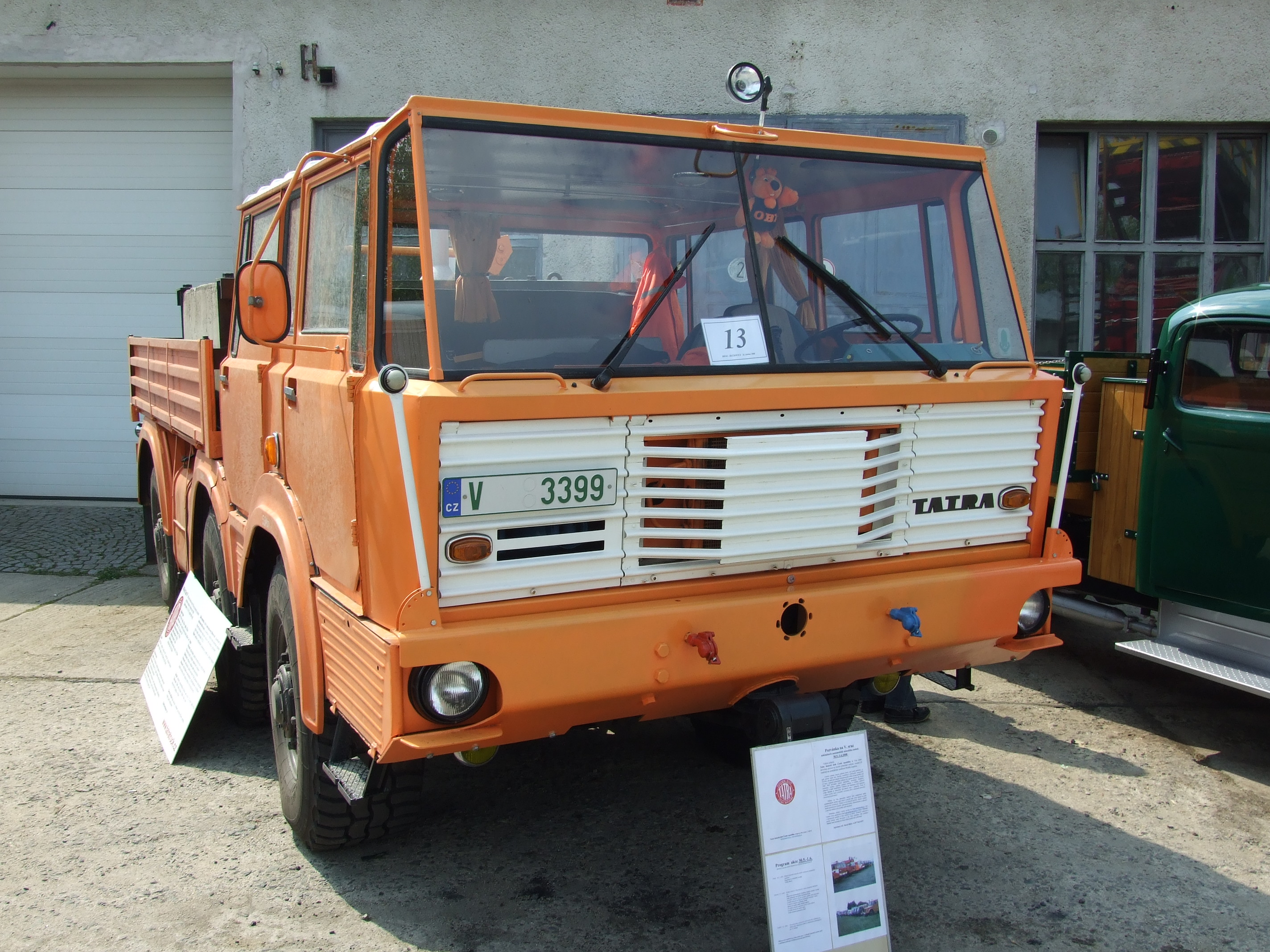
T813 6×6

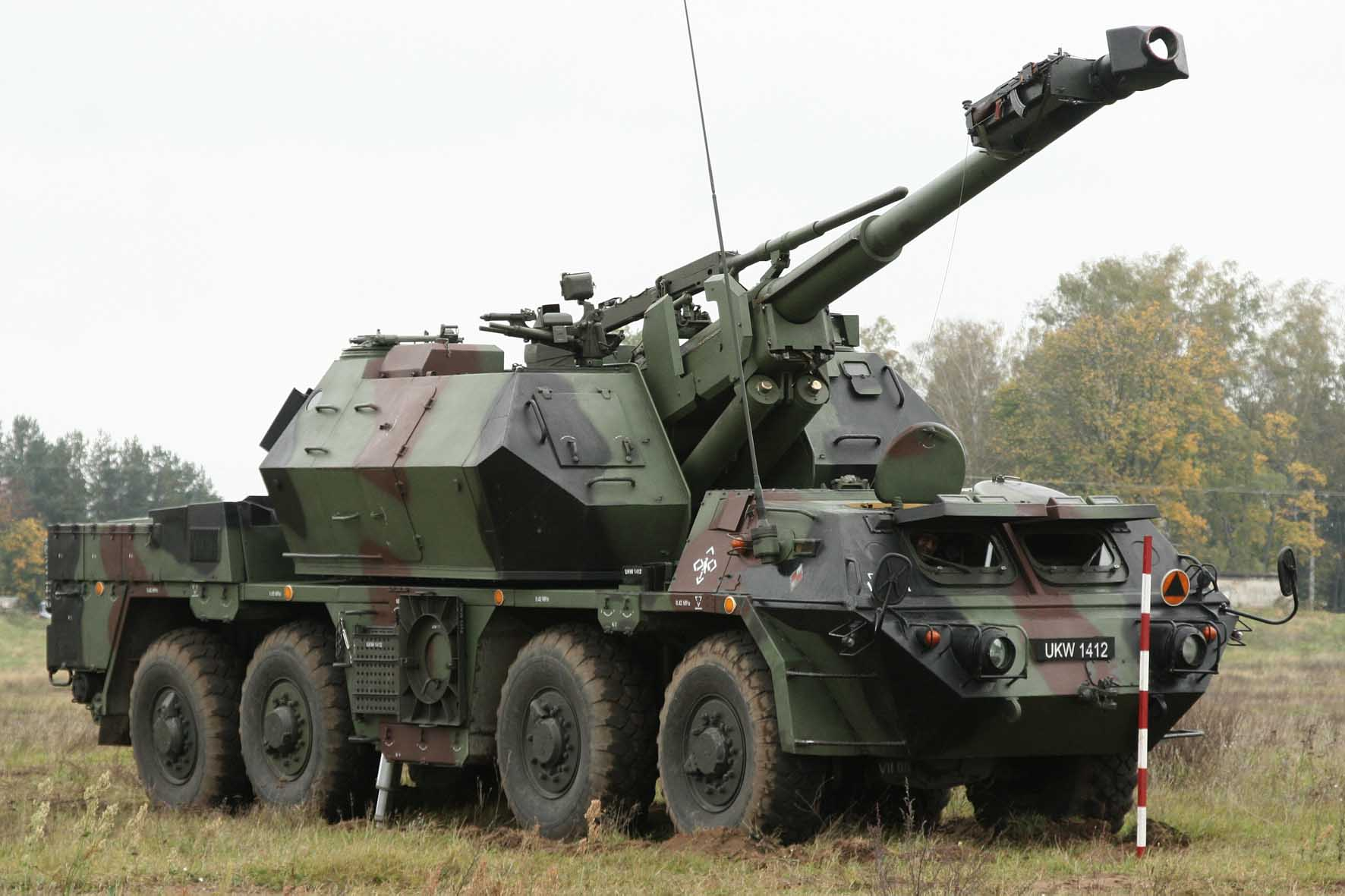
152mm SpGH DANA

== Sport ==
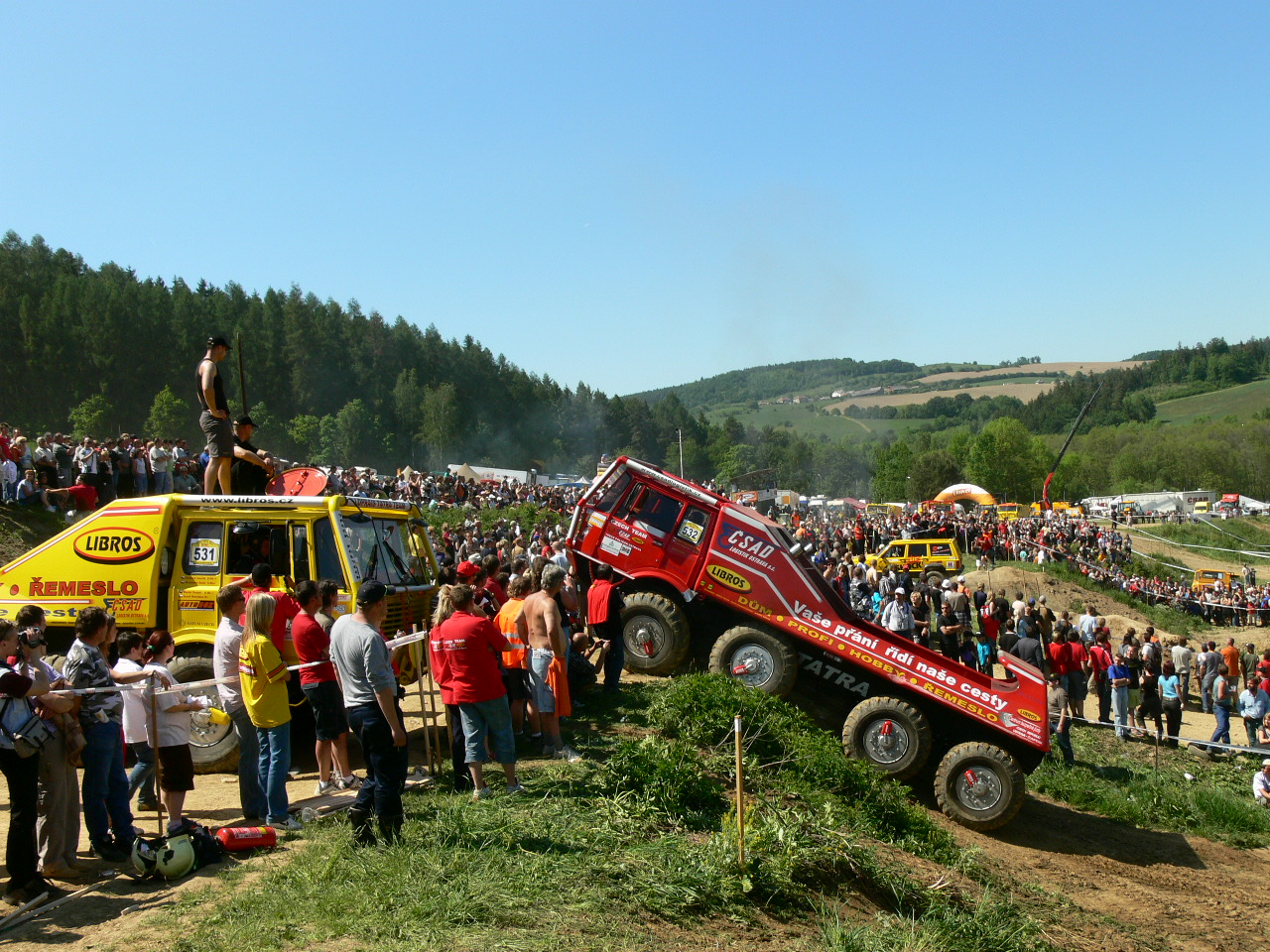
Tatra T813 participating in truck trials in Mohelnice, Czech Republic, May 2007

The T813 became popular after the fall of the Iron Curtain in the West as an extreme off-road truck, participating at the various truck trials across Europe.
