= Tatra 815 =

Czech truck family

T815, T815-2, TERRN°1, Terra
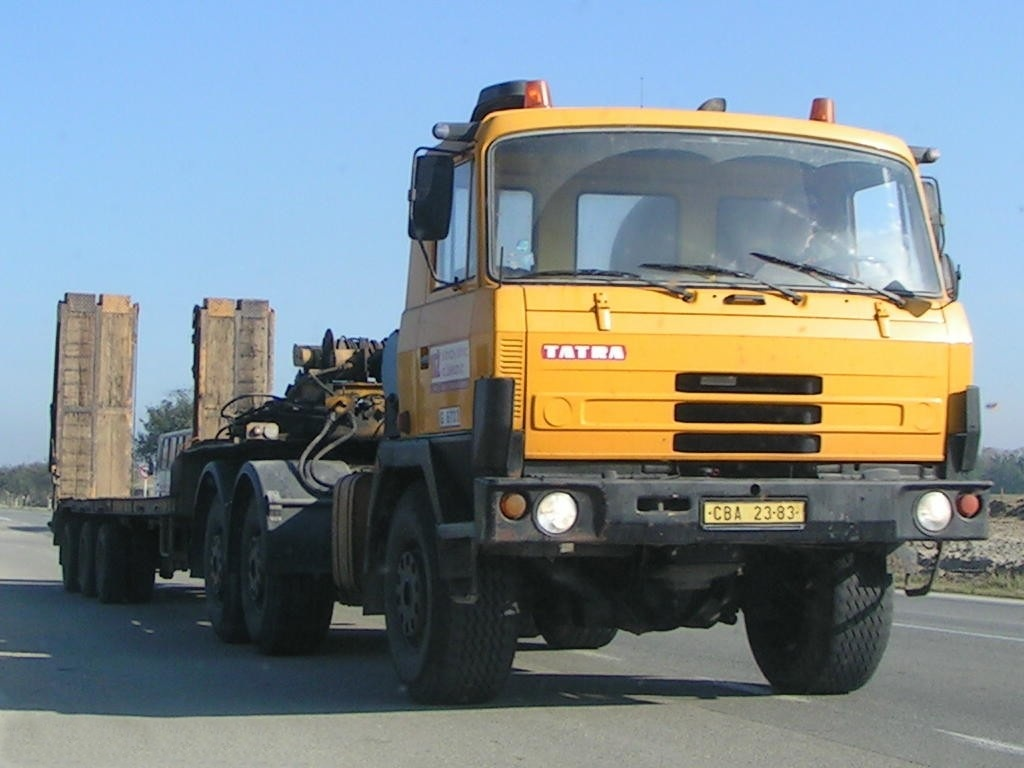
- Tatra T 815 (2005)

Overview
- Manufacturer: Tatra
- Production: 1983–2025, 158,065 units made
- Assembly: Kopřivnice, Moravia, Czechoslovak Socialist Republic until 1990; Czech and Slovak Federative Republic of 1990 - 1992; Czech Republic since 1993

Body and chassis
- Class: Heavy Truck
- Body style: COE; Cab forward

Powertrain
- Engine: Diesel naturally aspirated or turbocharged: Tatra (Air-cooled); V8 (12.6 L) 1983–present; V10 (15.8 L)1983–present; V12 (19.0 L) 1983–present; Deutz KHD BF8M 1015C; V6 (11.9 L); V8 (15.8 L); MTU; V12 (183TD224)(22.5 L); V12 (1163) (440 kW); Cummins; L10 (10.0 L); M11 (10.8 L); ISM (10.8 L); ISL (8.9 L); ISB (5.9 L); CAT; C13 (12.5 L); C15 (15.2 L); C18 (18.1 L); Detroit; 6067SK60 (11.1 L)
- Transmission: Tatra; 10 speed manual (10TS180); 14 speed manual (14TS210L); 14 speed semi-automatic; TwinDisc; 6-speed automatic (TD-61-1175); 10-speed automatic (TD-101-3600); Allison; 5- & 6-speed automatic

Dimensions
- Curb weight: up to 15,000 kg (33,069 lb)

Chronology
- Predecessor: Tatra 813
- Successor: Tatra 817 Force (military); Tatra 158 Phoenix (civilian)

Tatra ON AIR T3D-928 EURO 5 SCR

Overview
- Manufacturer: Tatra

Layout
- Configuration: V8
- Displacement: 12,667 cc
- Cylinder bore: 120 mm (4.7 in)
- Piston stroke: 140 mm (5.5 in)

Combustion
- Turbocharger: 1
- Fuel type: Diesel fuel
- Cooling system: Air-cooled

Output
- Power output: 280 kW (375 hp) @ 1700–1750 rpm; 325 kW (436 hp) @ 1700–1750 rpm
- Torque output: 1,800 N⋅m (1,300 ft⋅lbf) @ 1000–1200 rpm; 2,100 N⋅m (1,500 ft⋅lbf) @ 1000–1200 rpm

Dimensions
- Dry weight: ~ 1,200 kg (2,646 lb)

The Tatra 815 is a truck family, produced by Czech company Tatra. It uses the traditional Tatra concept of rigid backbone tube and swinging half-axles giving independent suspension. The vehicles are available in 4x4, 6x6, 8x8, 10x8, 10x10, 12x8 and 12x12 variants. There are both air-cooled and liquid-cooled engines available with power ranging from 230 to 440 kilowatts (310 to 590 hp). As a successor to Tatra 813 it was originally designed for extreme off-road conditions, while nowadays there are also variants designated for mixed (both off- and on-road) use. The gross weight is up to 35,500 kg (78,264 lb).

The 815 and its descendant models took the Czech truck racer Karel Loprais to victory six times in the Dakar Rally.

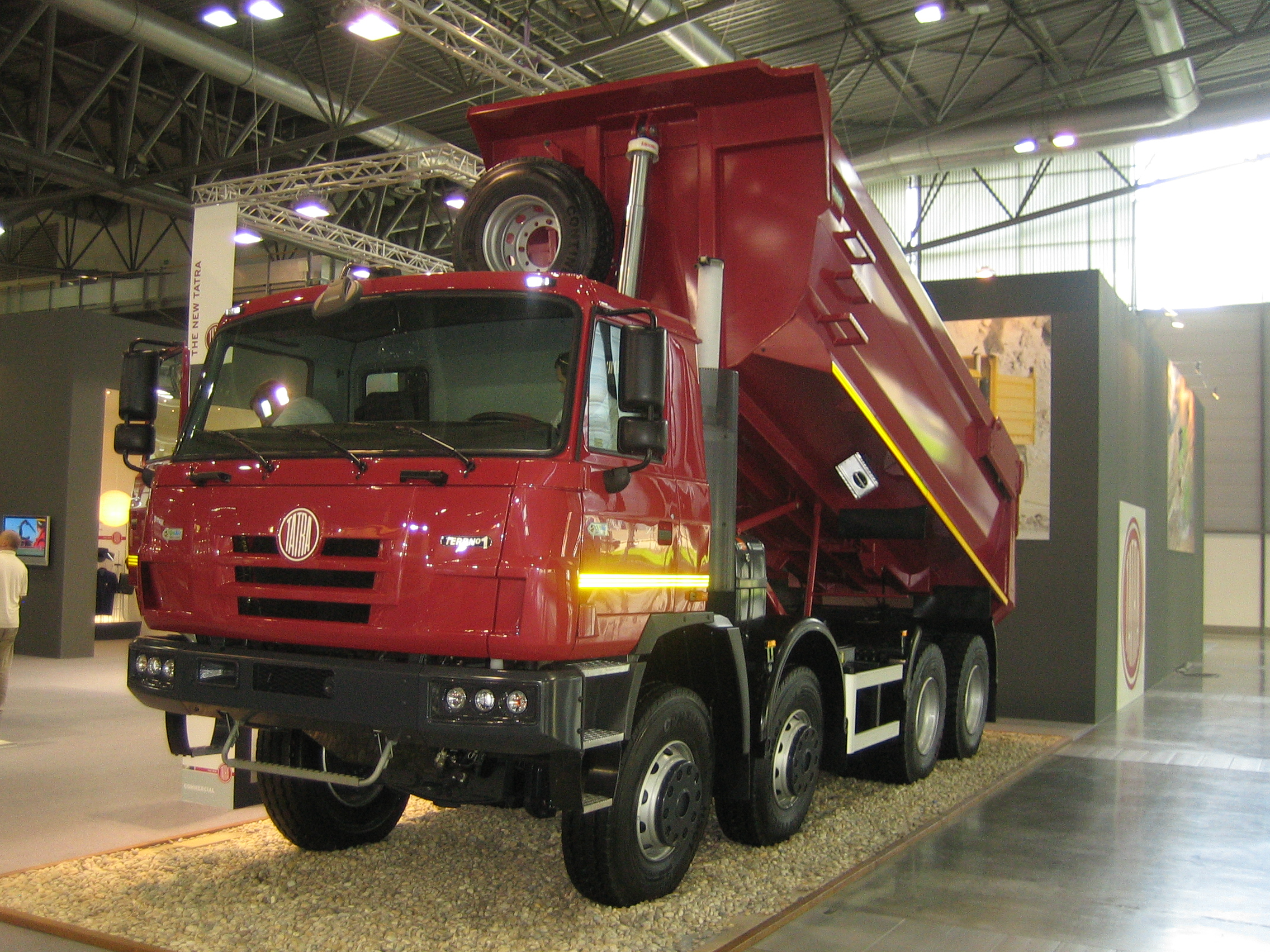
T815 TERRN°1 2010 facelift

== History ==
Designed to eventually replace the Tatra 148, the prototype Tatra 157 was introduced in 1970 and several more prototypes were designed between 1970 and 1974 period but no production resulted. Due to protests from another Czechoslovak manufacturer LIAZ which was assigned by the government central planning committee to manufacture trucks of similar class, Tatra dropped the 157 and instead started to concentrate on a heavier class as the replacement for the 813 and 148 which was introduced in 1983 as the 815 series. In 1989 Tatra modernized the 815 and introduced new 815-2 which received further upgrade in 1994 and just 3 years later in 1997 the new cabin TerrN°1 is introduced. Another facelift followed in 2000 where changes included among others new instrument panel and cab attachment and for the first time there is an option for fitment of liquid-cooled engines. The latest facelift of cabin came in July 2010. Due to emission requirements changes in 2003 Tatra developed all new V8 engine T3C to comply with Euro III where it followed the tradition once again with its air cooling design. The further developed T3D engine was introduced in 2006 with its SCR and Euro IV compliance.

Manufacturing ended on 25 February 2025 with 158,065 units made.

== Design ==
While most other manufacturers derive their trucks from road applications, the 815 was purposely designed for extreme off-road conditions, and its road versions are derived from the off-road original concept. The principle consists in a central load-carrying tube with independently suspended swinging half-axles bolted as one whole. This gives Tatra vehicles outstanding driving qualities in the most difficult terrains. The concept allows higher off-road speed compared to classical rigid axle design.

=== Central load-carrying tube ===
The primary structural feature of Tatra trucks is the central load carrying tube, also called a backbone frame. All other parts of the truck are mounted to this rigid assembly. The inherently high torsional and flexural rigidity of this layout protects superstructures from the motions and forces on the axles. Torque distribution to the axles is also carried within the backbone.

=== Differential ===
Tatra differentials are a unique design that uses two opposing spiral bevel gears instead of the usual single set. The differential gears are part of the input drive shaft rather than between the output axles as in a conventional differential. All versions of the Tatra differential have locking pins that can force the differential gears to rotate together, "locking" the differential. This arrangement had two distinct advantages. The first is that the dual output bevel gears allow the axles to swing around the drive axle without the need for universal couplings. The second is that the input drive shaft goes essentially straight through the differential housing, allowing simple coupling to a second set of swing axles. This modular design enables configurations of 2, 3, 4, 5, or even 6 axles with all axles driven. The whole assembly is part of the backbone frame.

=== Suspension ===
==== Front ====
- Mechanical suspension of load capacity up to 8 tons per axle by torsion bars – for versions with one steered front axle (4x4 and 6x6) or by leaf springs – for versions with two steered axles (6x6, 8x8, 10x10 or 12x12).
- Air-bellows, with a load capacity of 9 tons per axle and a possibility of a ground clearance regulation.

==== Rear ====
- Mechanical – by leaf springs, with a load capacity of up to 11.5 tons per axle
- Air-bellows with a load capacity of 10 tons per axle and a possibility of a ground clearance regulation
- Tatra King Frame suspension system - combination of an air-bellow with a coil spring placed inside, with a load capacity of up to 11.5 tons per axle or combination of air-bellows with leaf springs, with a load capacity of 13, 15 and 16.5 tons per axle.

All suspension types are equipped with telescopic shock absorbers; some versions also have stabilizer torsion bars.

=== Engine ===
The Tatra engine is an air-cooled, OHV, currently 12.7 litre 90° V8 120 x 140 mm diesel engine with direct fuel injection. It is turbocharged by one Holset WasteGate turbocharger, and equipped with an intercooler placed directly over the engine. The engine is equipped with a mechanically controlled in-line Bosch injection pump. Its roller crankshaft bolted together from individual segments belongs among unique technical solutions. The engine is available in emission specifications Euro II - Euro III with power output ranging from 230 to 325 kilowatts (308 to 436 hp) and 1,400–2,100 N⋅m (1,000–1,500 lbf⋅ft) torque. At its launch, the T815 could alternatively be delivered with a larger powertrain. Available options, all of which were from Tatra's own range of engines, included the air-cooled V10 (15.8 litre) and V12 (19 litre), both without turbo and intercooler, and a V12 bi-turbo. When the Euro I emission limits came into effect, the larger engine alternatives became unavailable.

The 815 can also be fitted with water-cooled engines made by other manufacturers - notably Cummins and Deutz with power ranging from 260 to 440 kilowatts (350 to 590 hp) with 1,550–2,750 N⋅m (1,140–2,030 lbf⋅ft) torque.

The most powerful MTU engine that was used in a 815 prototype tank prime mover, had an output of 610 kilowatts (820 hp) displacing 21,930 cc.

=== Transmission ===
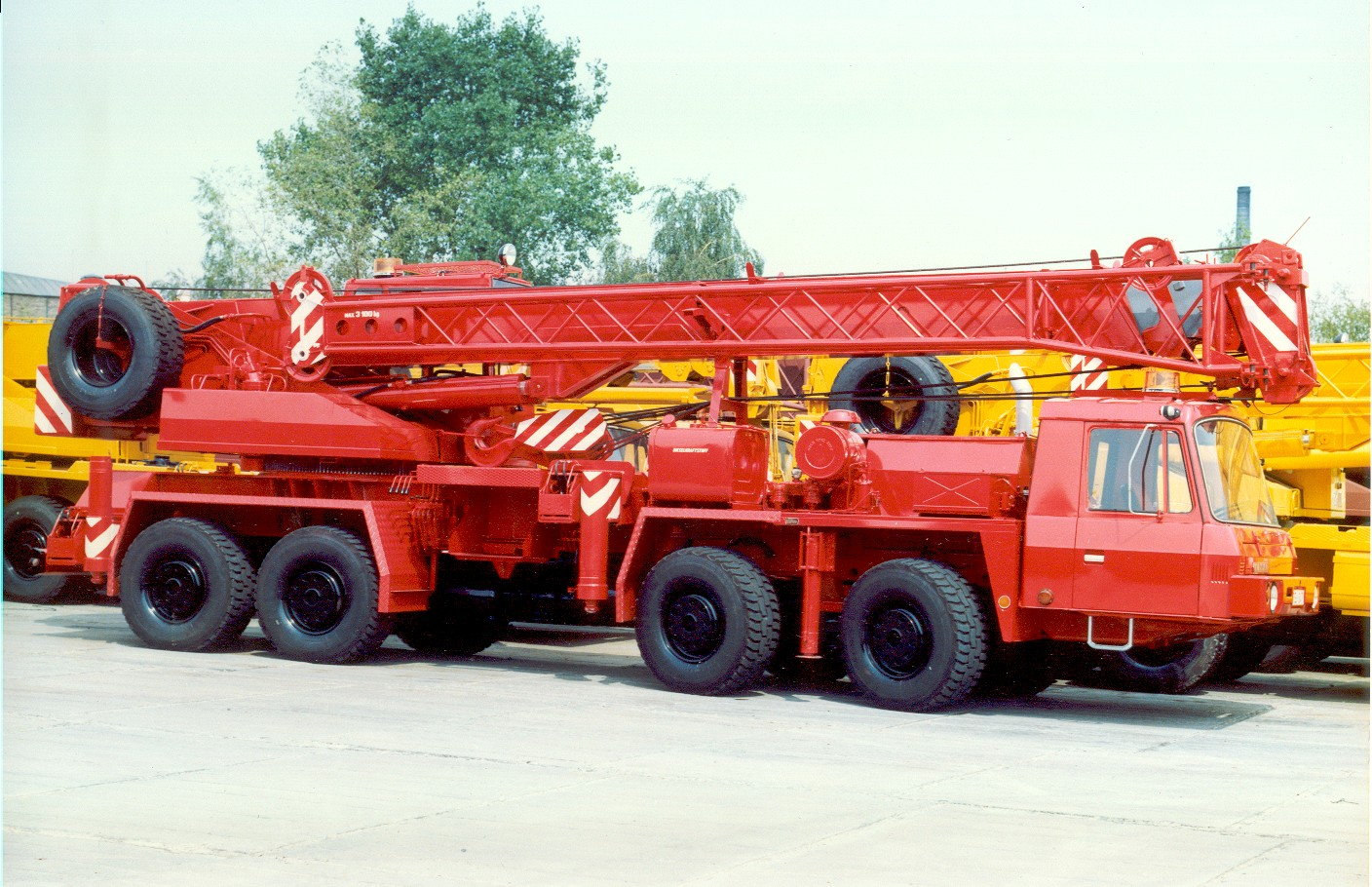
Tatra T815 8x8 crane with low cab

- Manually controlled mechanical Tatra transmission which is mounted directly on the auxiliary transmission case, and which, therefore, is an integrated part of the chassis with 10 or 14 gears with two auxiliary gears.
- An electronically controlled gear shifting Tatra - a driver using a joystick just pre-sets a speed gear, and after the clutch is engaged, the speed shifting is carried out. The driver is informed about the shifted speed gear by means of a dashboard display.
- Twin Disc which is a six-gear auto transmission of 1189 or 1177 type
- Allison six or seven-gear automatic transmission with a compact construction in one case, with a torque converter, which are mounted directly on the engine

=== Cab ===
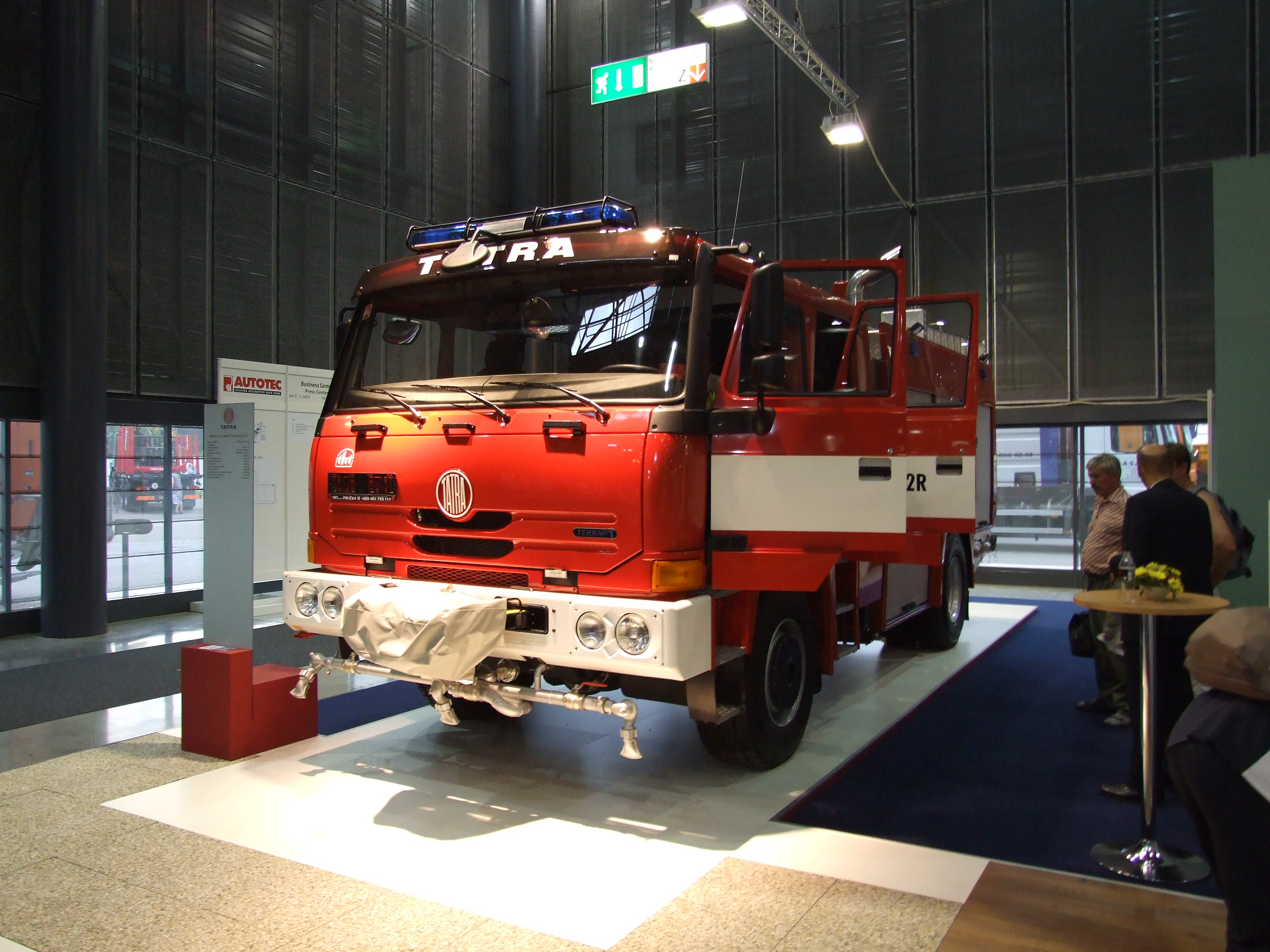
Tatra T815 TERRN°1 4x4 fire engine

Tatra T815 is equipped with own Tatra-produced COE cab. There is a basic version, extended version with room behind seats used for a berth and especially for fire-fighting applications, and a long four-door cab enabling transportation of up to six persons.

There is also special low cab version used mostly for cranes and other special applications. The cab is situated in front of the front axle.

=== Equipment ===
- Trucks equipped with air-bellows suspension have possibility of a ground clearance regulation.
- Special protective surface finish
- Central tyre inflation system enabling deflation/inflation of tyres during the drive in boggy terrain (standard for military versions, on demand for civilian)
- Multi-fuel engines for military version (on demand)
- Vehicle radio-shielding as per NATO standards for military version
- Possibility of additional cab ballistic protection through a supplied and subsequently installed additional armouring set intended also for windows for military version

== Variants ==
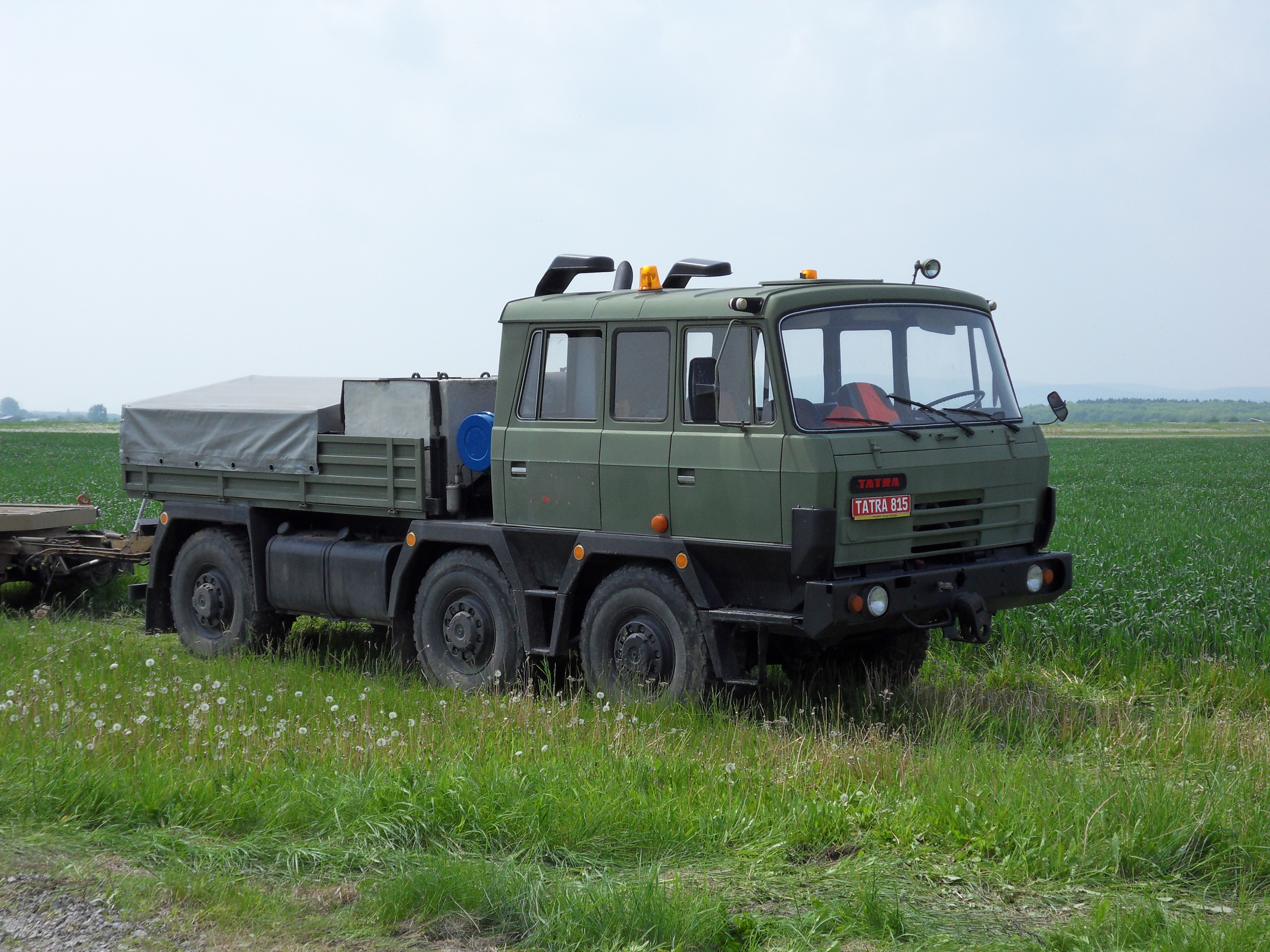
Tatra T815 TP 6x6 military version

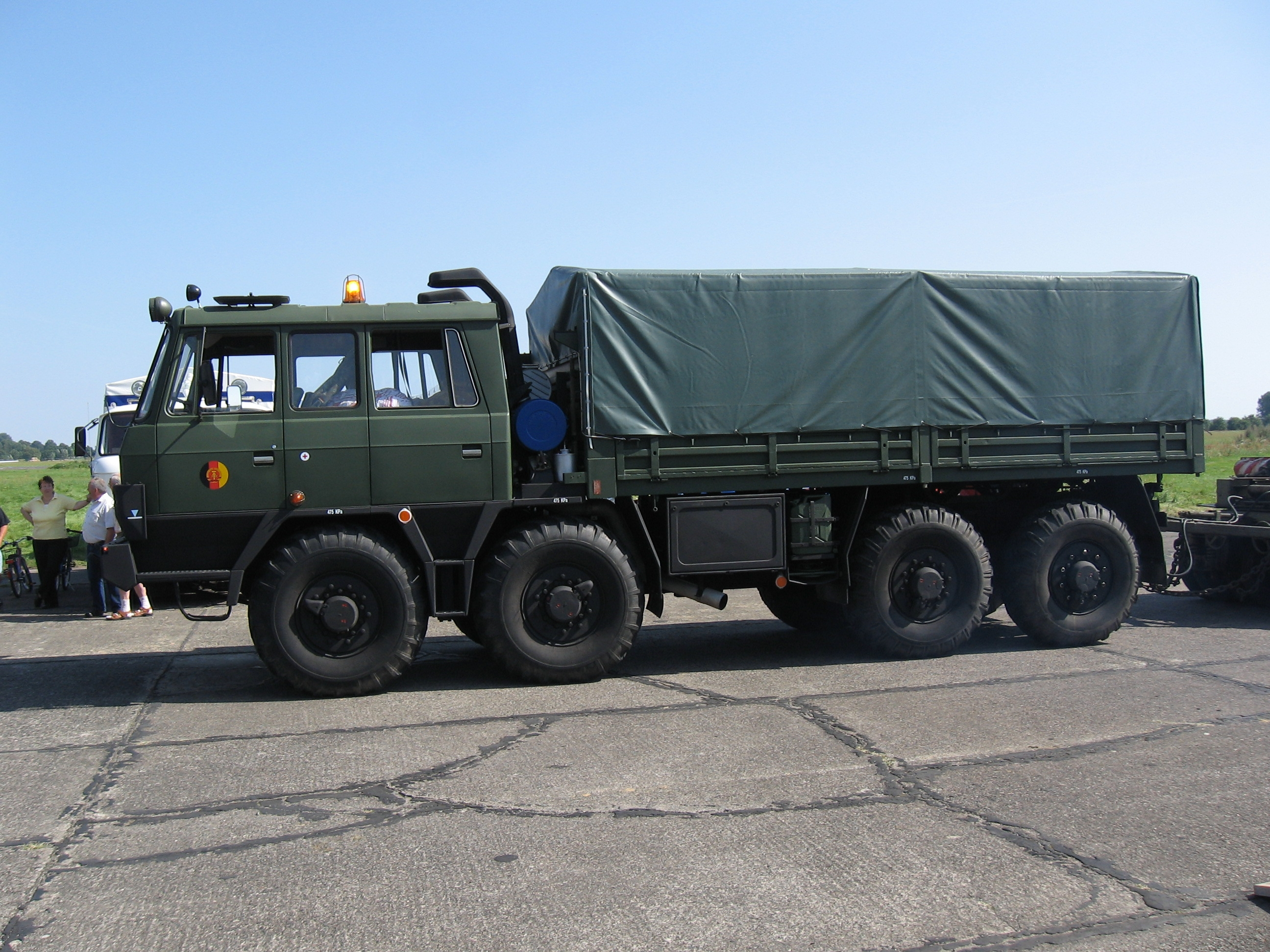
Tatra T815 NVA military troop and cargo carrier

- Civilian
  - Tatra 815
  - Tatra 815 low cab (for cranes and installation of other special superstructures)
  - Tatra 815-2 (outdated, but still manufactured on demand)
  - Tatra 815-2 TERRN°1 (most demanded and sold, core of the current T815 range)
  - Tatra 815-7
  - Tatra 815-6 Force (ultra-heavy fire-fighting offroad truck)
    - There is wide variety of superstructures built on Tatra T815 ranging from tipper S1 and S3 trucks, flatbed truck, tanker, drilling platform (used notably in Australia and Russia), autocrane, excavator, concrete mixer, semitrailer tractor and many other.
- Military
  - Tatra 815 Armax
  - Tatra 815-6 Force (the category of the heaviest military trucks with outstanding mobility in the most difficult terrain conditions)
  - Tatra 815-7 Force
    - The military versions vary from 4x4 troop or cargo carrier to 12x12 BrahMos supersonic cruise missile carrier (used by India). Still produced.
- Racing

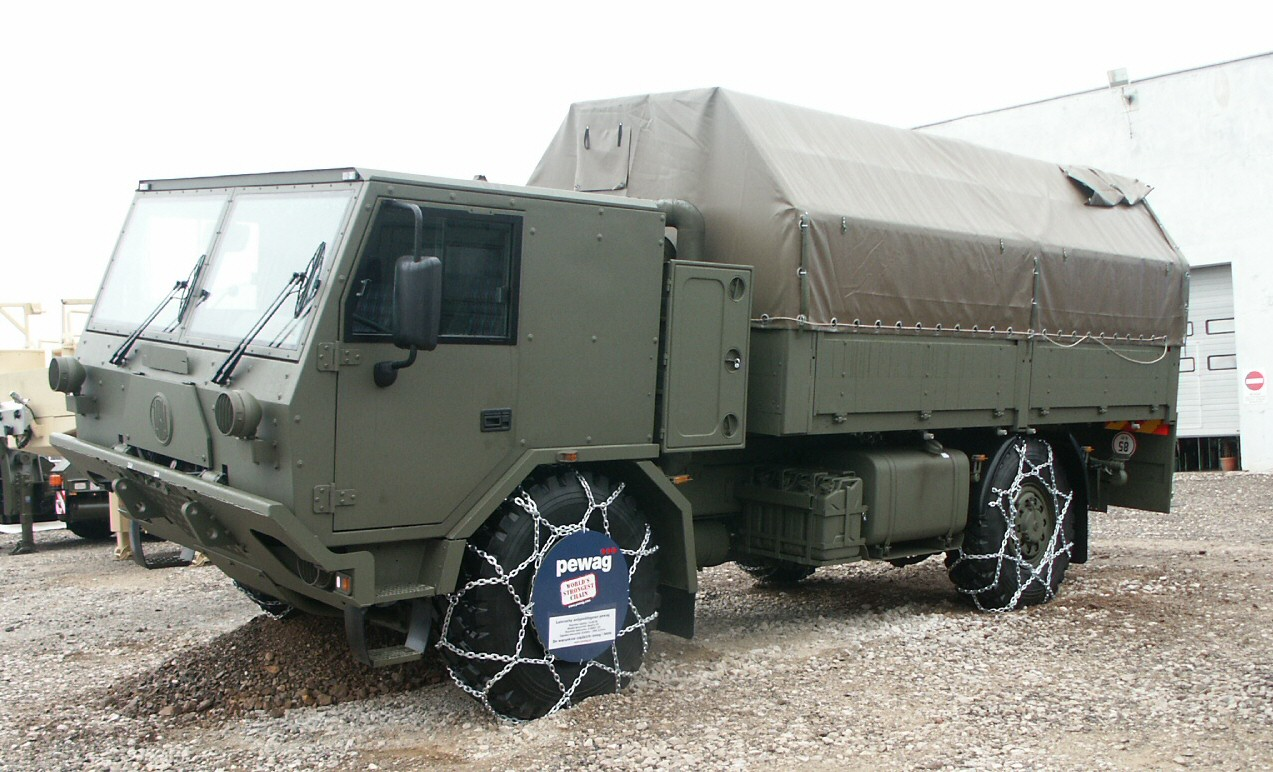
Tatra T815-7 Force

  - Rally raid - Tatra trucks are very successful in rally raids, notably in Dakar where Karel Loprais achieved 6 times victory with T815. There were both 4x4 and 6x6 used in rally raids, and T815 8x8 "Totálka" is the heaviest car ever used in rally.
  - Truck trial where the 813 gained reputation of invincible off-road truck, of which the 815 is a worthy successor

== T815 users ==
=== Civilian ===
==== Europe ====
All versions for all applications are sold in countries of Central and Eastern Europe as well as in Germany and France. In Central Europe the trucks are used mostly by construction companies, logging companies and mining companies. They are notably popular as fire-fighting engines. In far eastern Russia the Tatra Trucks are used by oil and gas companies in the most difficult terrains, where the air-cooled engine has advantages over water-cooled ones during harsh winter time.

==== America ====
The Tatra 815 is exported to the United States and Brazil. It used to be marketed under mark "American Truck Company" in the United States, where T815 and T815-6 Force is used as heavy fire-fighting engine.

==== Australia ====
In Australia the 815 is used notably by mining companies (i.e. as heavy drill 10x10 carrier)

==== India ====
There is assembly line of Tatra vehicles in India.

The 815 is available also in some African and Asian countries

=== Military ===
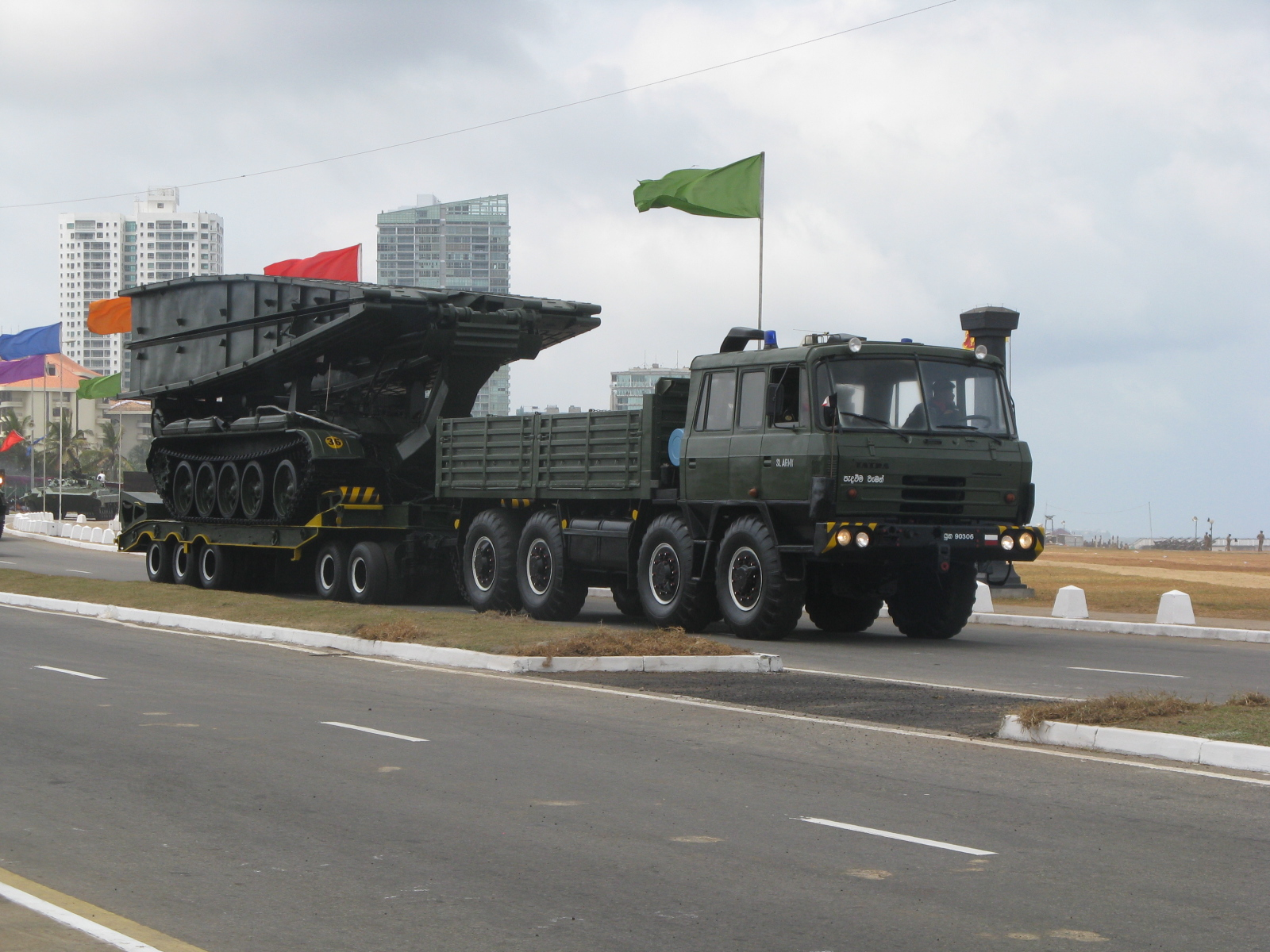
Sri Lanka Army MT-55A Armored Vehicle-launched Bridge pulled by Tatra T815 Truck

All Variety Types of Tatra Trucks and Chassis like T815 & T810 vehicles are widely used by militaries in the following countries: Cyprus, Czech Republic, Greece, Romania, Slovakia, Saudi Arabia, Sri Lanka, Syria, Qatar, UAE, India, Indonesia, Italy, France, Malaysia and United States with many other countries.

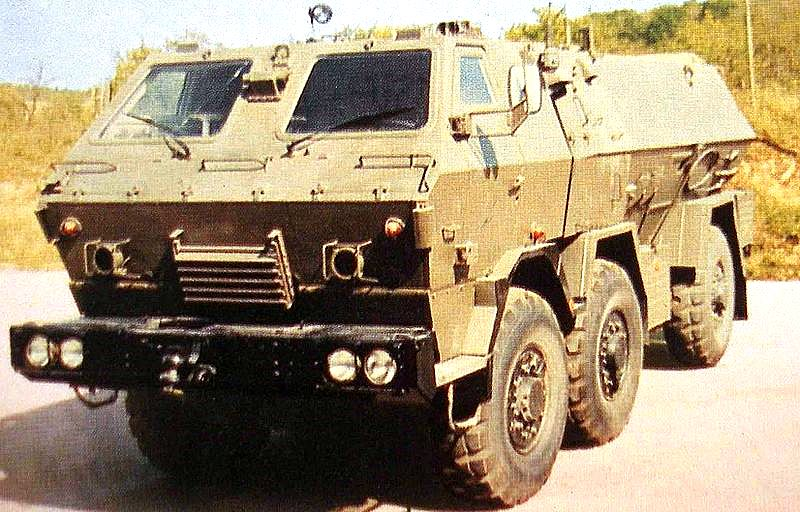
TATRAPAN of Slovak Army

== Derivatives ==
- Tatrapan - Slovak armoured truck in several variants, including APC variant
- Astros - chassis for multiple rocket launcher produced in Brazil
- Nexter Caesar - French self-propelled howitzer
- mobile surgical unit by German company Drehtainer
- ATLAV APC
- Rosenbauer Tigon

== Specifications ==
=== Tatra vehicle coding ===
The full name of a given vehicle explains most essential information about it. Take as example T 815 - 231S25 28 325 6 x 6 . 2 R / 34 1:

- T815 = truck family
- 231S25
  - 2 = truck family - T 815-2 Cab over engine TerrNo1 or Armax
  - 3 = engine type - T3D-928.30 air-cooled
  - 1 = vehicle variant - Euro 5 left hand drive with ABS
  - S = vehicle type - tipper (Sklápěč)
  - 2 = cab type and axle configuration - short cab, 6x6 or 4x4
  - 5 = Rear axles and suspension - Combined suspension, load capacity 11 tons, no reductions, axle ratio 3,385
- 28 = gross vehicle weight (tons)
- 325 = engine power (kW)
- 6x6 = wheel drive
- 2 = tire fitting - dual
- R = hub reduction
- 34 = wheelbase (mm) - number x 100
- 1 = variant - serial vehicle
