= DRDO Self Propelled Mine Burier =

Indian automated mine laying system

DRDO Self Propelled Mine Burier (SPMB) is an automated mine laying system installed on a cross-country mobile vehicle. It has been developed in India by Research and Development Establishment, Pune, a laboratory of DRDO, Ministry of Defense for the Indian Army.

== Description ==
The mines in SPMB are stored in palletized containers housed inside the vehicle. A burying mechanism is installed at the stern of the vehicle. The commander can select the type of mine from a panel and it moves on a conveyor belt. An arming device arms the mines before it is buried in the ground. The system carry around 480 mines and can bury 240 mines in an hour. The SPMB can lay four types of anti-tank mines such as ND MK-1, Indian magnetic influence mine Adrushy MK-I, Adrushy mine-II and French electrically fuzed HPD F2. The prototype of the system has been developed and as of 2009 it was in trials.

== See also ==
- Arjun (tank)
- Kartik BLT
- DRDO Daksh
