= Research & Development Establishment (Engineers) =

Indian research laboratory

- Established: 9 February 1962
- Director: V V Parlikar
- Location: Pioneer Lines Dighi, Pune-411015, Pune, Maharashtra
- Operating agency: DRDO

Research & Development Establishment (Engineers) (R&DE(E) or R&DE(Engrs)) is a laboratory of the Defence Research & Development Organization. Located in Pune, Maharashtra, India. its primary function is development of mobility equipment for Indian Army Corps of Engineers.

== History ==
The Research & Development Establishment (Engineers) became operational on February 9, 1962. The laboratory's primary mission is to create cutting-edge engineering solutions for the Indian Army, Indian Navy, and Indian Air Force. In the Indian Antarctic Programme, the lab played an important role, especially in the establishment and upkeep of the Maitri Research Station.

One of the significant turning point in R&DE(E)'s history was its involvement in the Integrated Guided Missile Development Programme. Many vital defense platforms, including the Sarvatra Multi-span Mobile Bridge System, Modular Bridging System, Mountain Foot Bridge, Composite Sonar Dome, Mine Field Marking Equipment Mk-2, Unmanned Aerial Vehicles, NBC collective-protection systems, and launching systems for land and underwater applications, including Akash, MRSAM, and BrahMos missiles, were delivered as a result of the laboratory's successful development and production of critical ground systems for various missile projects.

Since 2017, R&DE(E)'s electro-mechanical engineering division has been working on the launch vehicle, an element of the ground system that was effectively put into operation during Mission Shakti, as part of the Indian Ballistic Missile Defence Programme.

Makarand G Joshi took over as the Director of Research and Development Establishment (Engineers) on June 1, 2023, succeeding Pradeep Kurulkar, who was detained by the Maharashtra Anti-Terrorism Squad in May 2023 for allegedly giving sensitive information to Pakistani Intelligence. Makarand G. Joshi was instrumental in making R&DE(E) a leader in composite materials. The laboratory possesses proficiency in micro-electro-mechanical systems and robotics. For the Advanced Medium Combat Aircraft, R&DE(E) is focusing on composites, shaping methods, radar-absorbent materials, and radar-absorbent paint.

A technology transfer agreement for modular bridging systems with lengths ranging from 14 to 46 meters was signed by R&DE(E) and Indian private firm NIBE Limited in June 2025. For the ten-year technology transfer to produce Modular Bridging Systems in India, NIBE Limited would pay ₹3.76 crore (US$390,000). Complete technical expertise and testing procedures will be supplied by R&DE(E).

== Technology centers ==
R&DE(E) is changing from being a systems engineering organization to a technology-focused research center starting in 2025. The laboratory has divided its research into six distinct verticals.

1. Center for Systems & Technologies for Advanced Robotics (C-STAR) - focuses on the development of humanoids and robotic mules. Studies on swarm intelligence, AI & ML applications, biomimetic robots, and cognition-based robotics.
2. Composite Research Center (CRC) - specializes in using composite materials for airframes, aircraft radomes, sonar domes, armored hulls, and bridges. Stealth technology, fatigue analysis in composites, and structural health monitoring are important areas of focus.
3. Centre for Electromagnetic System Research (CEMSR) - electromagnetic launch systems are the focus. Developing military aircraft launchers and arresting systems.
4. Advanced Technology Research Center (ATRC) - centered on subsurface blast mitigation, smart structures, and land-mine detection.
5. Center for Renewable Energy & Storage Technology (CREST) - constructing small energy storage devices, energy harvesting, and wireless power transmission.
6. Center for Strategic and Tactical Systems (CSTS) - oversees the creation of ground support systems and launchers for strategic and tactical missile programs.

Ceramic matrix composites and carbon fiber silicon carbide are the next priority area, according to DRDO Chief Samir V. Kamat, because of their necessity in aero engine programs and hypersonic missiles.

== Projects ==
=== Sonar Dome ===
Below the waterline, every anti-submarine warfare (ASW) ship is equipped with a sonar array. The sonar dome is a structure that is placed over the sonar array to protect its sensors and electronics from the harsh environment. The sonar dome must be both acoustically transparent and structurally sound. Mazagon Dock Shipbuilders received delivery of the bow-mounted Sonar Dome developed by R&DE(E) in 2016. Mazagaon Dock Shipbuilders received seven sonar domes from Indian private company Kineco Limited in 2020. These will be mounted aboard Indian Navy's Kolkata-class and Visakhapatnam-class destroyers.

=== Daksh robot series ===
==== Daksh - Remotely Operated Vehicle ====
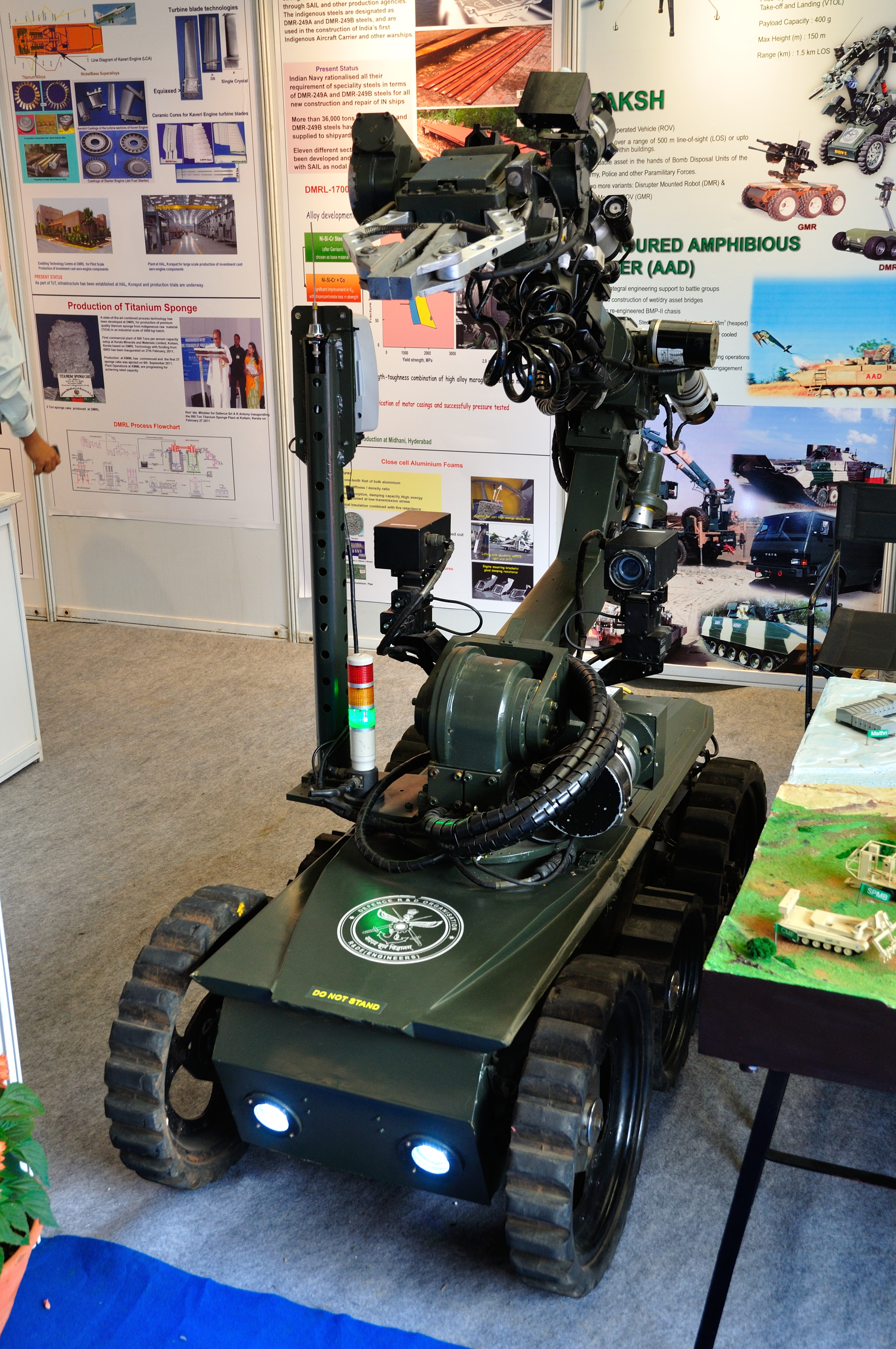
Daksh - Remotely Operated Vehicle.

The remotely operated Daksh, created by R&DE(E) in collaboration Tata Motors, Theta Controls, Bharat Electronics and Dynalog India, was prepared for deployment into the Indian Army and Police in 2009. It has a rifle that allows it to blow through locked doors and can detect IEDs and radiation levels up to 500 meters away. Any four-wheeler that is thought to be carrying a bomb could be towed away. It can function in cross-country settings and even ascend a 40° incline staircase. At a cost of ₹3.50 crore (US$363,449), the project was finished by May 2005 after a 30-month development period. Daksh costs ₹80 lakh per unit, while the carrying vehicle costs ₹25 lakh. In September 2010, the initial order of 20 units was placed. The Indian Army received the first six units in 2011–2012.

With six degrees of freedom, Daksh's arm allows to remove explosives from beneath an automobile. It has a flexible workspace that allows it to reach any spot in any direction. It can carry 20 kg (44 lb) of weight and has a 2.5-meter arm reach. It has another 4-meter reach with an arm extension. Daksh can communicate photos to the master control by X-ray imaging. The master control supports real-time image transmission and display, as well as command and control. The water jet disrupter can disarm explosives in any situation. It uses a diode laser pointer for precise aiming and remote shooting. The water jet disrupter, which is mounted atop, can pierce half-inch thick plywood at a distance of 3-meter when 100 milliliters of water are added. The two front and rear cameras have a 22x optical zoom and focus. When necessary, the fourth camera is pressed into action, and the top wrist-cam is a pinhole camera.

With a single charge, it can operate continuously for 3-hours. It can be operated via fiber optic communication over a distance of 100 meters or wireless communication over a 500-meter line of sight. It was deployed in 2023 Uttarakhand tunnel rescue.

==== Daksh Mini, and Daksh Scout ====
As part of Daksh series, R&DE(E) created two lightweight robots in 2017 that can identify and neutralize IEDs on trains and airplanes. IEDs and other suspicious objects can be found, handled, and defused by the remotely operated Daksh Mini with high-resolution cameras and a six-axis telescopic manipulator arm. The robot can climb stairs and navigate obstacles because to its modular flipper-based architecture. The Daksh Scout is a remotely controlled vehicle that may be used for both daytime and nighttime surveillance. Because of its portability, it can be used in both limited spaces, such as culverts, and cross-country locations. It can be controlled from 200 meters away.

The Indian Army inducted Daksh Scout in April 2020. Daksh Mini and Daksh Scout were dispatched during the 2023 Uttarakhand tunnel rescue. On a single charge, the Daksh Mini can function for two hours. Up to 20 kg (44 lb) of weight can be lifted by the vehicle.

=== Trawl system ===
A mine clearing trawl system has been developed by R&DE(E) for the Indian Army. It successfully completed blast trials in 2017 under the supervision of High Energy Materials Research Laboratory. The tests were designed to show that the apparatus could withstand a series of blasts that were aimed precisely beneath the system. With its trawl roller, track width mine plow, and electro-magnetic device, the equipment can handle every kind of mine that main battle tanks may encounter during combat. Passive and active mines are among the types of landmines that the trawl system can breach.

=== Electromagnetic catapult ===
In order to facilitate the launch of heavier aircraft and UCAVs, the Indian Navy reportedly attempted in 2013 to equip the future projected aircraft carrier INS Vishal with an electromagnetic catapult. According to reports as of 2024, Bharat Electronics is developing it domestically with help from private sector companies, even though it was originally intended to be imported from foreign corporations. Defence Minister Rajnath Singh and senior Indian Navy officials have been shown the system concept. The Navy intends to obtain authorization to build a full-scale, ground-based model in order to start development.

R&DE(E) has created a scaled-down prototype that can launch payloads up to 400 kg over a short span of 16 to 18 meters, according to a media article from August 2024. They are currently looking for industry partners in order to continue development and scale up for use on future aircraft carriers. The system can manage platforms up to 40-tons in weight. Pulsed power, which regulates the electromagnetic catapult's power needs and guarantees accurate and reliable launches, and Linear Electric Machine, which generates the electromagnetic force needed to launch aircraft, are two essential technologies that have been effectively developed for electromagnetic catapults.

=== Bridging System ===
==== 46-meter Modular Bridging System ====
The R&DE(E)-developed Modular Bridging System is intended to allow traffic for up to MLC-70 tracked and wheeled vehicles. It is a completely decked, mechanically launched, single-span, 46-meter assault bridge that makes it easy for the troops to cross ditches and canals. With its high mobility, versatility, and durability, the new system can keep up with both tracked and wheeled mechanized vehicles. It is going to replace the manually launched Medium Girder Bridges.

The two Ashok Leyland Super Stallion 10x10 HMVs launcher vehicles and seven Tata LPTA 8X8 HMVs carrier vehicles make up one set of bridging system that enable the simultaneous deployment of bridges at two distinct locations. The system complies with all quality criteria characteristics and has undergone field evaluation user trials. The bridge design has been verified for 1,500 launch cycles and 10,000 MLC-70 load passes. The 46-meter modular bridge, manufactured by Larsen & Toubro, was introduced by the Indian Army in February 2024. A total of 41 sets, worth ₹2,585 crore (US$268 million), would be gradually introduced till 2027.

==== Short Span Bridging System ====
In collaboration with Larsen & Toubro, R&DE(E) conceived and developed the Short Span Bridging System. Two SSBS-5m prototypes on Tatra 6x6 chassis, and two SSBS-10m prototypes on Tatra 8x8 re-engineered chassis supporting MLC-70 were developed. SSBS is compatible 75-meter Sarvatra Multi-span Mobile Bridge System. Faster troop mobility is ensured by the SSBS-10m, which spans the gaps up to 9.5 m in a single span and offers a 4 m wide, completely decked roadway. It can carry main battle tanks across various water obstacles and is mechanically launched. Following successful completion of all trials, SSBS-5m and SSBS-10m are prepared for induction. The Indian Army received the first three sets of SSBS-10m from Larsen & Toubro in December 2020. Out of the 102 units ordered, another 12 SSBS-10m was delivered on July 2, 2021.

==== Mountain Foot Bridge ====
Made of high-strength aluminum alloys, the Mountain Foot Bridge costs less than ₹1 crore. It can endure the conditions seen in high-altitude areas such as Siachen Glacier. It takes around two hours to erect a 35-meter MFB. It can allow up to half a meter of fresh snow to accumulate. With a route 0.8 meters wide, the MFB can span dry/wet distances up to 34.5 meters.

As part of further development, a light-weight, manually launched mountain bridge for all-terrain vehicles with a gross vehicle weight of 1,000 kg (2,200 lb), a total length of 24 meters, and a 1.8-meter walkway has been created. The bridge is composed of man-portable, high-strength aluminum alloy components. It has a launching system that makes it possible to launch the bridge from the near bank without having to go to the far bank. Given the restricted amount of backspace available for launching in mountainous areas, the system is designed to be small. The bridge's joints make field assembly simple. The modular system primarily consists of deck modules, top bars, and triangular panels. With 15 crew members and a captain, a 24 m bridge can be launched in roughly 150 minutes. On December 15, 2021, the Ministry of Defense and the Indian private company Worldwide Oilfield Machine signed a ₹32 crore (US$3 million) agreement for the production and delivery of 30 lightweight Mountain Foot Bridge units to the Indian Army, following the acquisition of technology from R&DE(E).

=== Unexploded Ordnance Handling Robot ===
R&DE(E) debuted a remotely operated UXOR at DefExpo 2020 that has the ability to handle and disperse unexploded munitions. Up to 2 km (1.2 mi) away, the Master Control Station (MCS) can manage UXOR while maintaining a safe distance. It can deal with anything from a 1,000 kg (2,200 lb) bomb to a mortar shell. UXOR features two arms to pick and cut the ordnance, and its tracked wheels let it to work on uneven surfaces. To cut and disperse the munitions, UXOR uses fast abrasive water jets. Because UXOR has several cameras installed, the user can maneuver the vehicle, comprehend the sort of ordinance, and aim the jet precisely to diffuse the bomb from MCS. Unexploded bombs can be removed off runway using UXOR. The Indian Air Force is in the process of purchasing UXORs as of 2020.

Following the conclusion of the IAF's user trials, R&DE(E) provided three licenses for the production of the UXOR in 2021. Internal combustion engine-powered UXOR boasts a tracked skid-steer loader platform with six hours of endurance and cross-country mobility. Unexploded munitions with low order detonation can be defused by the rapid abrasive water jets. By removing the fuse for smaller munitions or cutting the case for large bombs, the seven-axis manipulator holds the nozzle through which the abrasive compound cuts through steel up to 25 mm thick, making the UXO safe. There are several degrees of freedom in UXOR. The Indian Army is also showing interest in UXOR.

Sagar Defence Engineering, a private company in India, and Bharat Electronics were chosen as industry partners in 2025 to manufacture UXOR. Software integration, manufacturing protocols, design documentation, quality assurance standards, and field maintenance procedures for UXOR will all be fully accessible through DRDO. In addition to educating IAF personnel in robot operation, maintenance, and emergency protocols, the contract calls for the delivery of numerous UXOR units by 2027 and the provision of field deployment support for the initial operational integration at certain airforce facilities.

=== Humanoid robots ===
In May 2025, R&DE(E) achieved an important milestone in development of humanoid robots for defense applications. Prototypes for the robot's upper and lower bodies have been created by the Center for Systems & Technologies for Advanced Robotics, and during internal testing, some applications were successfully achieved. By participating in high-risk military missions under human supervision, the robot seeks to lessen the likelihood that soldiers may encounter potentially fatal situations. With closed-loop gripping, the humanoid's upper body system would be capable of carrying out intricate autonomous tasks. Additionally, it will be able to push obstacles, open valves, turn, push, pull, or slide doors, as well as operate in high-risk areas.

The humanoid upper body system would have a lightweight arm with a spherical revolute joint design. With two in the head, four in the gripper, and seven in the arm, it would have 24-degrees of freedom. It has been made to work with both arms in tandem to securely handle dangerous materials including mines, explosives, and liquids. It may operate both indoors and outdoors, day or night. Data fusion, tactical sensing, numerous proprioceptive and exteroceptive sensing capacities, and audiovisual perception would also be accessible.

The humanoid biped system was created with balance, control, and stability in mind for negotiating uneven ground. It would be able to generate and navigate maps in real time, as well as have real-time dynamics and kinematics in addition to fall and push recovery capabilities. Additionally, the humanoid biped system can design a path, simultaneously locate and map in unstructured terrain, and execute sophisticated autonomous tasks in high-risk areas. With a completion date of 2027, the project has been underway since 2022.

=== Armoured Engineer Reconnaissance Vehicle ===
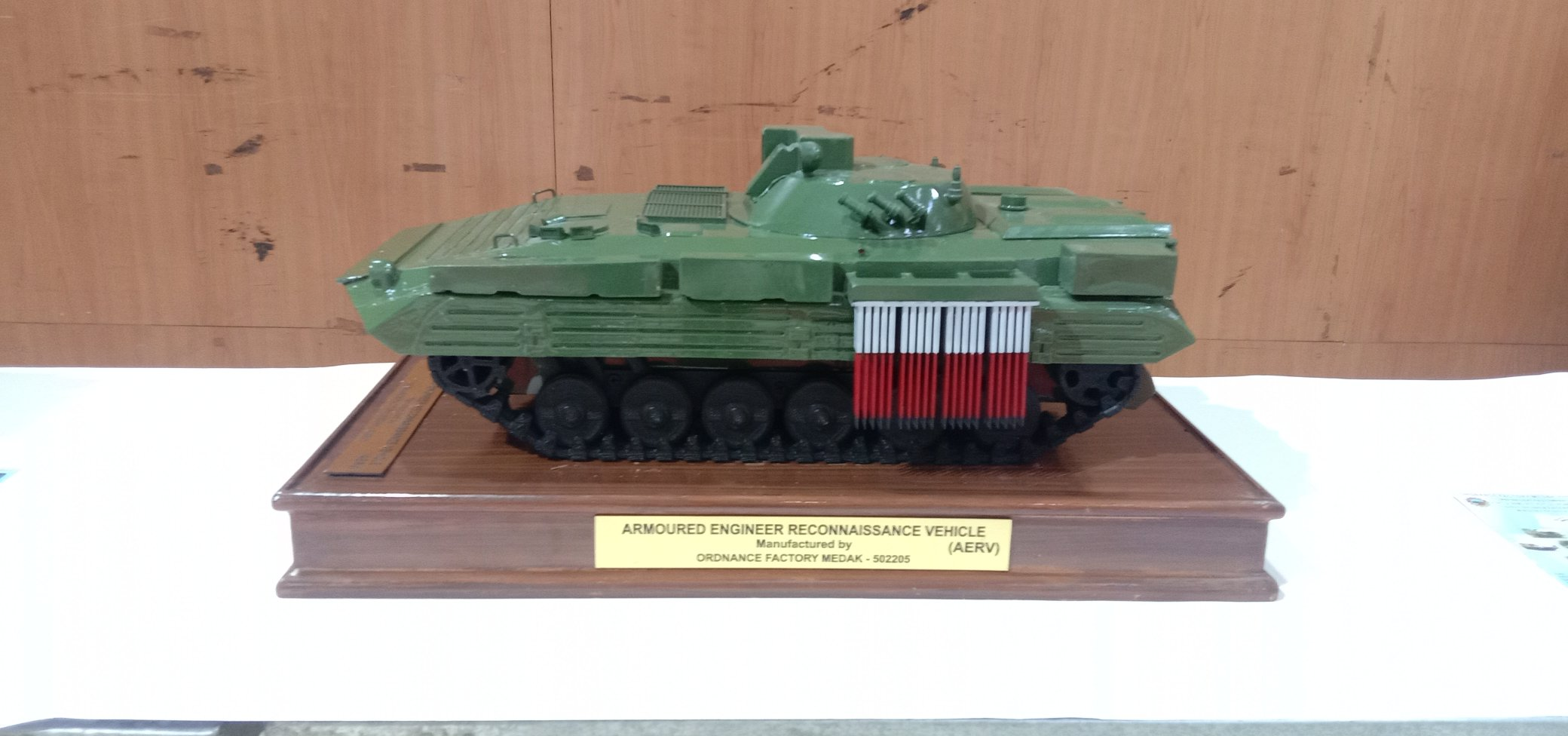
AERV model.

The AERV was created by altering BMP-2 to satisfy the tactical and combat needs of military engineers conducting underwater and terrestrial surveys in hostile environments. Its main purpose is to build assault bridges for offensive and defensive operations in desert, flat, and even riverine regions. It received its official induction into the Indian Army Corps of Engineers in December 2021. 53 AERV units have been ordered by the Indian Army, and they will mostly be used on the Western front with the individual engineering divisions.

=== Mechanical Minefield Marking Equipment ===
In 2021, BEML released the first Mechanical Minefield Marking Equipment Mk-2 prototype, which was constructed on a BEML-TATRA 6x6 chassis. With a picket spacing of 15 meters, the Mechanical Minefield Marking Equipment Mk-2, developed by R&DE(E), is intended to mark and fence mine fields at a speed of 1.2 km/h semi-automatically with minimal human intervention. With a 5-meter increment, the system may position the pickets between 10 and 35 meters apart. This device can push the picket down to a maximum depth of 450 mm. In all weather conditions, the MMME Mk-2 system is intended to function in the semi-desert and desert regions of Rajasthan as well as the plains of Punjab. 500 pickets and 15 km of polypropylene rope can be stored in the system.

It will replace Minefield Marking Equipment Mk-1 in the Indian Army. The system consists of pneumatic, electrical, mechanical, and electronic subsystems. One Picket Storage Unit, one Picket Holder Assembly (PHA), ten rope spools with brake mechanisms, a buffer assembly, a container, a platform, a single linear motor guide, two operator seats, and a pneumatic system are among its mechanical components. The Power Distribution Unit (PDU), linear motor, lights, ventilation, and power pack are all part of the electrical subsystem. The pickets are driven into the ground by a linear motor, which is stored on a stopper when not in use. An electronic actuator is used to operate this stopper. The necessary power is provided by a diesel generator, and the PDU regulates it according to the needs of the machinery. An auto/manual control panel, field and main junction boxes, a driver's display screen, a linear motor controller, a Distance Measuring Device (DMD), and a number of sensors are all part of the electronic subsystem. These parts enable pneumatic and electrical actuators to operate automatically. Every subsystem is integrated into a box-shaped container that is welded to the platform and fastened to the vehicle frame with U-bolts. The system needs a crew of four, consisting of three operators and a driver, and can function in temperatures ranging from 0 °C to 45 °C. The Indian Army inducted the MMME Mk-2 in August 2025.

== Industry collaboration ==
Svaya Robotics collaborated with R&DE(E) and the Defence Bioengineering and Electromedical Laboratory to create India's first quadruped robot and wearable exoskeleton. The purpose of the quadruped robot is to enable the defense and security forces to conduct remote reconnaissance and inspection in unstructured terrain. The exoskeleton is being created to fit the anthropometry of Indian soldiers and increase their strength so they may lift large objects with little effort and walk long distances without becoming tired.

== Controversy ==
=== Corruption ===
According to a 2014 article in The New Indian Express, R&DE(E) built a chariot for the Alandi Temple, using ₹5 crore (US$519,213) in public funds. After reporting the misuse to the Central Vigilance Commission, a top scientist lost his projects and was moved to a different facility. The whistleblower was harassed by the accused officials, who also deducted his project credits. He was sent to the Electro Mechanical Systems (Missile Launcher Group), where he lacked experience, from the Combat Engineering Group. On November 14, 2014, the Bombay High Court took notice of the scientist's plea and sent notifications to the CVC, the Defence Secretary, and the head of the DRDO, requesting a response by December 17, 2014. When members of Parliament, asked for details of DRDO's expenditures during the 2015 Lok Sabha session, S. Guruprasad, Director of R&DE(E), defended his choice by pointing to the advancement of battery technology being developed for the chariot, which has military applications. DRDO maintained that the funds were provided by devotees who approached R&DE(E), with remaining ₹20 lakh cost for technology development being approved from the Director's financial authority. Instead of being donated to the temple, the chariot is in R&DE(E)'s inventory.

The same whistleblower informed the Prime Minister's Office in 2015 that CVC was conducting a corruption investigation into a senior scientist who had been nominated for the 2014 Scientist of the Year Award. Citing Cabinet Secretary Pradeep Kumar Sinha's directives from August 20 that writing directly to the PMO in breach of a designated channel of communication must be taken seriously and is subject to disciplinary action, DRDO served him with a show-cause notice. On September 19, the whistleblower wrote to Defense Minister Manohar Parrikar, including the PMO and DRDO Director General, asking that the award be postponed. On September 23, 2015, Manohar Parrikar presented the award to 14 scientists, including the alleged corrupt scientist.

=== Espionage ===
In May 2023, the Maharashtra Anti-Terrorism Squad detained senior scientist Pradeep Kurulkar for giving a Pakistani agent classified information and for sexually abusing two women by offering them positions in the DRDO, according to the chargesheet in the DRDO espionage case. Kurulkar's correspondence with Pakistani spy Zara Dasgupta was among them. In addition to other secret defense programs including drones, unmanned aerial vehicles, and military bridge systems, the WhatsApp conversations and voice call transcripts he exchanged with the spy contained information on Indian missile systems like the Agni missile launchers, surface-to-air missiles, and Brahmos launcher. Zara Dasgupta, who claimed to be a software engineer from United Kingdom, became friends with Kurulkar through pornographic content and texts. Her IP address was found to be in Pakistan during the inquiry. Both were in communication from June 2022 to December 2022.

== See also ==
- DRDO Self Propelled Mine Burier
- Indian Antarctic Programme
- Integrated Guided Missile Development Programme
- Indian Ballistic Missile Defence Programme
- Mission Shakti
- DRDO Sarvatra
- Advanced Medium Combat Aircraft
