= Leguan armoured rapid bridge =

KNDS Deutschland Leguan
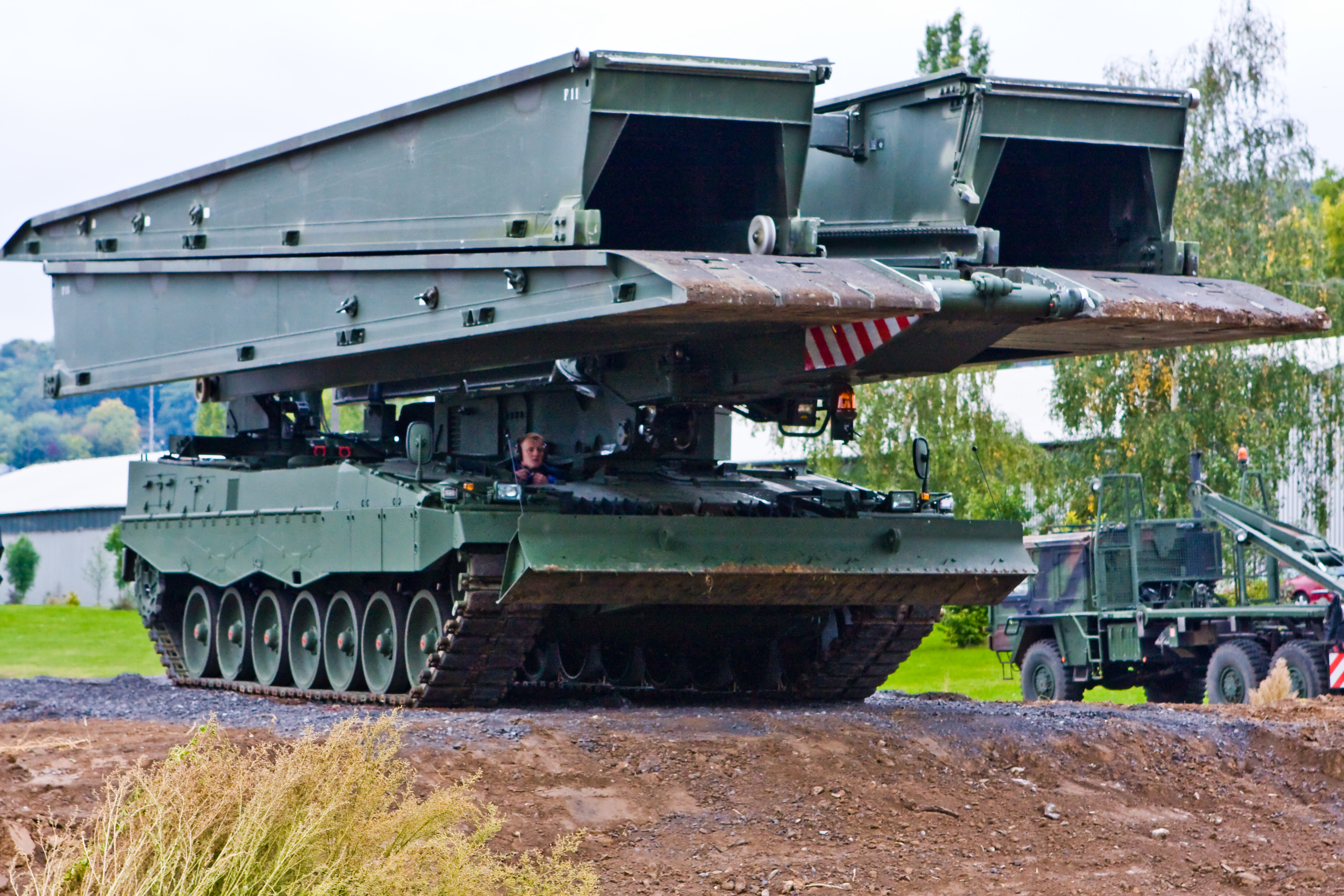
- KNDS Deutschland Leguan - Leopard 2
- Type: AVLB
- Place of origin: Germany

Service history
- Used by: See operators

Production history
- Designer: MAN-Mobile Bridges GmbH
- Manufacturer: MAN-Mobile Bridges GmbH: May 2005: KMW: May 2005 to December 2025; KNDS Deutschland since December 2015
- Produced: 1987–present
- No. built: Quantities as of 2020: Leguan bridge systems: 244 on tracked vehicles; 45 on wheeled vehicles; Bridges: 483 bridges; 7 ferry and floating kits

Specifications
- Mass: 63.5 t (140,000 lb) (Leopard 2 Leguan)
- Length: 1 × 26-metre bridge variant: 14.48 m (47 ft 6 in); 2 × 14-metre bridge variant: 15.12 m (49 ft 7 in)
- Width: 1 × 26-metre bridge variant: 4.02 m (13 ft 2 in); 2 × 14-metre bridge variant: 4.05 m (13 ft 3 in)
- Height: 1 × 26-metre bridge variant: 4.00 m (13 ft 1 in); 2 × 14-metre bridge variant: 3.97 m (13 ft 0 in)
- Engine: MTU MB 873 Ka-501 V12 twin-turbo diesel engine 1,500 hp (1,100 kW)
- Power/weight: 23.6 hp/t (17.6 kW/t)
- Operational range: Road: 430 km (270 mi); Offroad: 250 km (160 mi)
- Maximum speed: Forward: 68 km/h (42 mph); Backward: 31 km/h (19 mph)

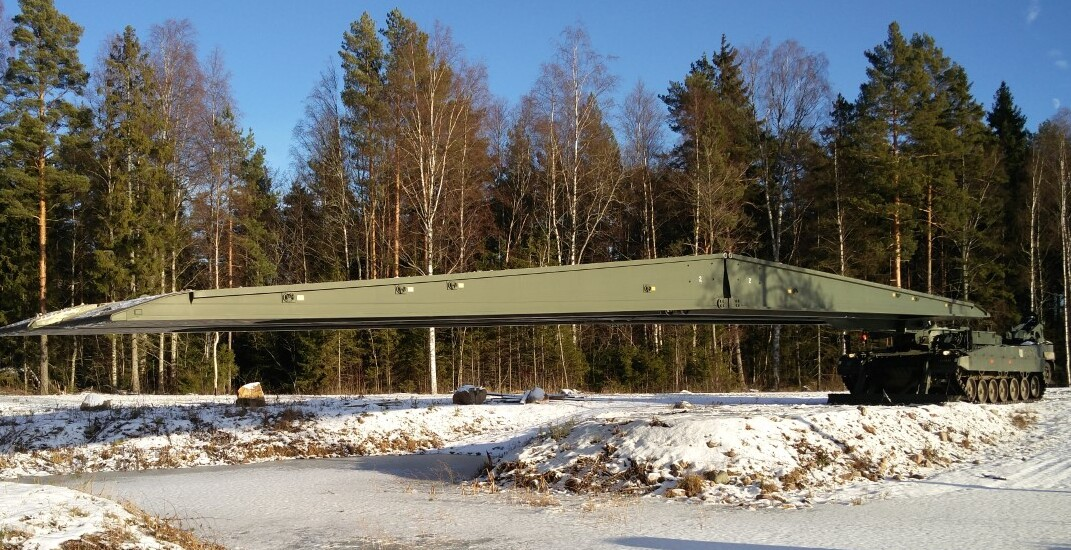
Swedish Army - Brobandvagn 120 with a 26-metre coupled bridge

The Leguan armored rapid bridge (German: Panzerschnellbrücke Leguan) is a bridge system offered by KNDS Deutschland for overcoming obstacles. It was developed by MAN Mobile Bridges GmbH (a subsidiary of Krauss-Maffei Wegmann in 2005, merged in 2006 and company dissolved). The bridge-laying system is a further development of the laying principle of the Biber rapid tank bridge (Biber) with a lower silhouette. The Leguan system is in use worldwide, i.e. by Germany, Belgium, Finland, Switzerland, Sweden, Malaysia, and the United States, among others, with various bridge-laying vehicles. The Bundeswehr officially calls it 'Gefechtsfeldbrücke' (battlefield bridge).

The Bundeswehr tested it from 2009 onwards.

The US Army planned to purchase 465 M104 Wolverine bridge-laying tanks, an iguana system based on the M1 Abrams hull. Following budget cuts, only 44 vehicles were manufactured between 1997 and 2001; the remainder was cancelled without replacement.

== Design ==
=== Bridges ===
==== 14-meter Leguan bridge ====
- MLC 80: the Boxer mission-module offers a 14-meter bridge in this load category.
- MLC 100: as of the mid-2020s, the Leguan bridges offered can reach MLC 100 capabitlity.

==== 26-meter Leguan bridge ====
- MLC 60: the first variant of the Leguan bridge that was transported and laid down by the initial truck variant.
- MLC 70: the variant of the Leguan that was supplied with the Leopard 1 and the PT-71 Twardy were in this load category.
- MLC 80: the Leguan offered in the 2020s are in the MLC 80 category.

=== Carrier vehicles ===
In the transport position, the two symmetrical bridge halves, each 13 metres long in the 26-metre version, lie horizontally on top of each other on the vehicle's main and rear booms. To lay the bridge, the two elements are lifted and the lower half of the bridge is moved forward. After connecting the two halves, the entire fixed bridge is placed over the obstacle using the main boom. The bridge is picked up again in reverse order. During the laying process, the entire load rests on the support shield attached to the bow. According to the manufacturer, laying and removing the 26-metre bridge takes six and eight minutes respectively and can be carried out by one person using electronic controls. The 14-metre bridge can be laid in around five minutes and removed in seven minutes.

== Operators ==
=== Current operators of tank based Leguan ===
==== Leguan on Leopard 1 ====
Belgium (9)
The Belgian armed forces operate the Leguan based on the Leopard 1 as AVLB, and 9 of these were purchased. The quantity remaining in service is unclear.
Chile (N/A)
The Chilean Army is equipped with Leguan assault bridges based on the Leopard 1V chassis.
Chile purchased the 26-meter MLC80 bridges.
Greece (16)
The Hellenic Army operates 8 Leguan based on the Leopard 1GR chassis. The bridges purchased are the 26-meter MLC70.
Norway (13)

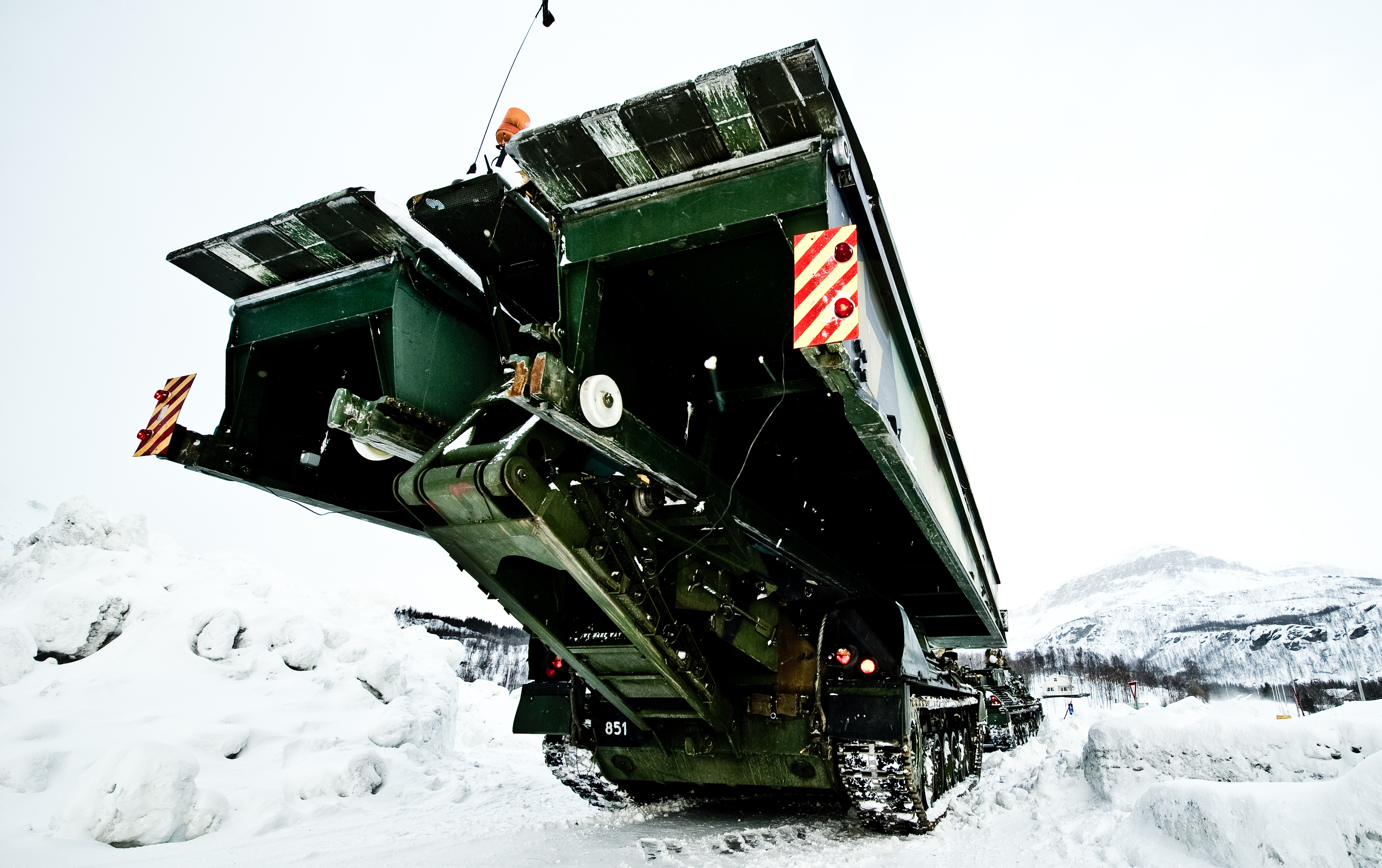
Norwegian Army - NM190 Broleggerpanservogn

The Norwegian Army had the Biber AVLB system installed on its Leopard 1. In 1995, Norway signed a contract with MAN Mobile Bridges GmbH to equip 13 Leopard 1 with Leguan bridging systems. A follow-up contract for 16 MLC 70 26-metre bridges signed in 1997.
It is designed locally as the NM190 Broleggerpanservogn. The quantity remaining in service is unclear.
Turkey (36)
The Turkish Army is equipped with 36 Leguan AVLB based on the Leopard 1. The system was ordered in November 2008.

==== Leguan on Leopard 2 ====
Denmark (7)
The Royal Danish Army operated the Leguan based on the Leopard 2 as AVLB. Seven systems were ordered in December 2019, the first was delivered in February 2025.
Finland (10 + 6 on order)
Purchases of the Finnish Army:
- In September 2002, Finland purchased 124 surplus Leopard 2A4 to Germany worth €200 million. As part of this purchase, multiple Leopard 2A4 were allocated for modifications, 6 engineering / mine clearing variants, and 6 Leopard 2L. The Leopard 2L is the Finnish designation for the Leopard 2 Leguan, and the modifications to the Leopard 2 chasses were performed by Patria. As part of a 2018 contract to purchase additional Leopard 2L, modifications to the first 6 were performed in order to be able to use various lengths of Leguan bridges.
- 11 April 2018, order for 4 Leopard 2L systems, with deliveries taking place between 2019 and 2021. Patria uses Leopard 2A4 that were purchased earlier by the Finnish Army. This order also includes truck based Leguan systems.
- 19 December 2023 order for 6 Leopard 2L systems worth €23.6 million, deliveries planned for the 2026 - 2028 period. The Leopard 2 are supplied by the Finnish Army, with the Leopard 2A4 in storage, KNDS Deutschland supplied the Leguan bridging system, and Patria is performing the modifications on the Leopard 2A4 hulls, and is refurbishing them.
Germany (31)
The German Army ordered in total 31 Leguan Leguan bridging system based on the Leopard 2 as AVLB.
Orders:
- 7 Leguan in July 2016, which were delivered between 2018 and 2021.
- 24 additional were ordered in 2020, with deliveries planned between 2023 and 2028.
Hungary (3)
The Hungarian Army ordered 3Leguan systems to support its new 44 Leopard 2A7 in December 2018.
The first system was delivered in May 2025, and the third by July 2026. It's designed locally as the Leguan 2HU.
Indonesia (3)
Three purchased in 2013 with refurbished Leopard 2A4 tanks.
Netherlands (8)
The Netherlands ordered the Leopard 2-based Leguan in 2016 with the German Army. It was ordered to replace the outdated wheeled variant
The first of eight systems designed locally as CSB, was delivered in December 2019, and the last in 2021.
Norway (8)
The Norwegian Army signed a contract in March 2019 to modify sixLeopard 2A4 that were in the reserve into Leguan AVLB systems to replace its existing Leguan fleet based on Leopard 1. The contract also included training simulators, and a peripheral camera vision system for the Leopard 2. The first system was delivered in 2021.
In 2023, the NDMA announced that 4 out of eight systems were delivered, meaning that a complementary order was placed in between. The plan includes to continue using the bridges that are in the army and also the purchase of additional bridges (MLC 80).
Singapore (10)

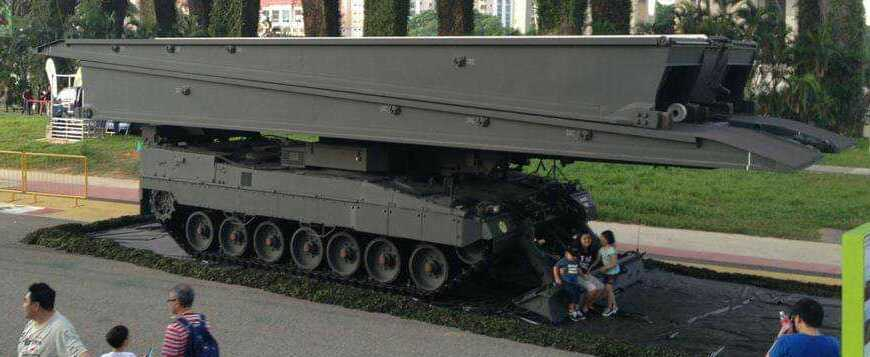
Singaporean Army - L2-AVLB

The Singaporean Army operates the Leopard 2SG, and has support vehicles based on it, such as the L2-AVLB that is equipped with the Leguan system.
Sweden (6)
The Swedish Army modified six Leopard 2A4 that were used to train the troops before receiving the Strv 122 into Leguan AVLB. The system is known locally as the Brobandvagn 120. The systems entered service in 2017-18, after the contract was signed in June 2014.
Switzerland (12)

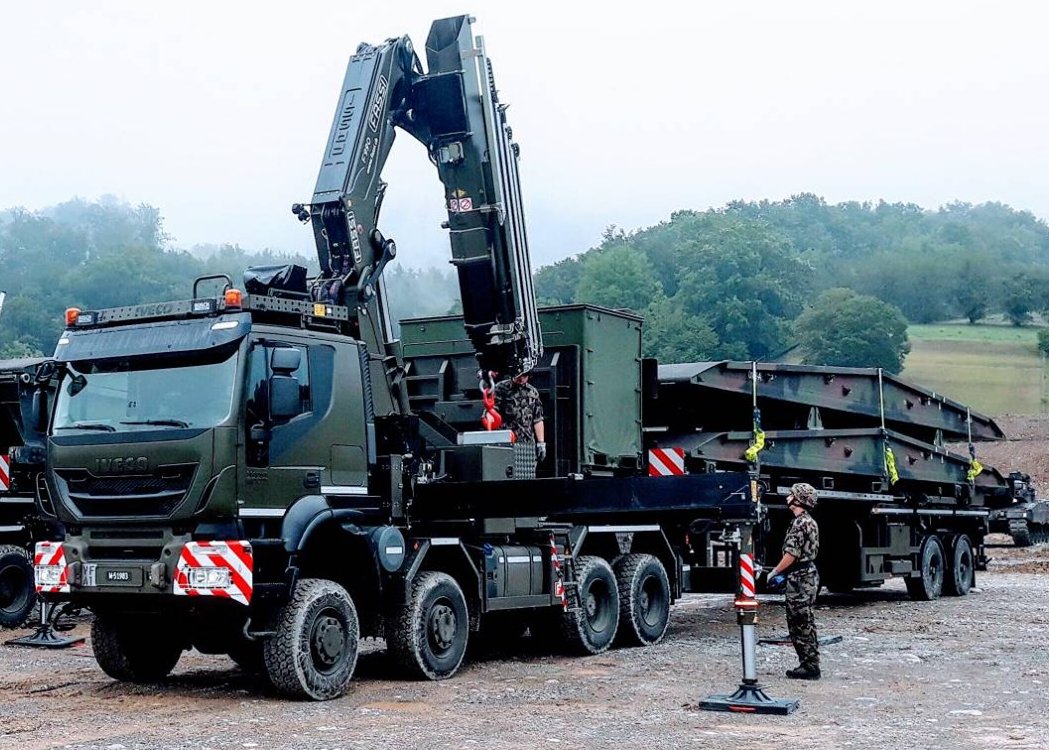
Swiss Army - Leguan transport

The Swiss Army ordered 12 Leguan Leguan bridging system based on the Leopard 2 as AVLB to replace the Brückenpanzer 68. The Swiss designation is Brückenpanzer Leopard (Brü Pz Leo).
The budget of CHF 179 million for the modification of 12 Panzer 87 into Leguan AVLB was approved with the Armament Programme 2014, and the last system was delivered in 2023.
The order included:
- For the military
  - 12 × 26-meter bridges
  - 12 × 2 14-meter bridges
  - 6 × Iveco Trakker 6×6 semi-trucks to transport the additional bridges.
  - 6 × Iveco Trakker 8×8 semi-trucks with a Fassi F990 knuckle boom crane to transport the additional bridges.
  - 12 × DOLL 2-axles variable length semi-trailers
- For civilian use:
  - 1 × 26-meter bridges
  - 1 × 2 14-meter bridges

==== M104 Wolverine - Leguan on M1A2 Abrams ====
United States (44)

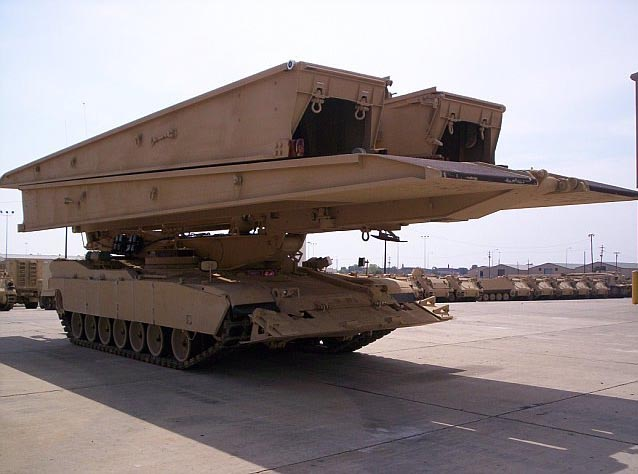
US Army - M104 Wolverine

The US Army acquired a total of 44 M104 Wolverine Heavy Assault Bridge, a Leguan system based on the M1A2 SEP chassis in a collaboration between GDLS USA and MAN Mobile Bridges GmbH. Initially the USA was planning on a purchase of > 450 systems, but the budget was reduced. Later on, the US Army purchased additional AVLB based on the M1A2 Abrams chassis, but with a bridge system developed by Leonardo DRS which became the M1074 JABS.

==== Leguan on M60 ====
Spain (12)
The Spanish Army received the VLPD 26/70E in the 1990s. 12 M60A1that were decommissioned were approved for transformation and the work started in 1996.
Note: The Spanish Army transformed 1 M47E2 Patto into a M47E2 LP Leguan AVLB to be tested as a prototype before developing the VLPD 26/70E.

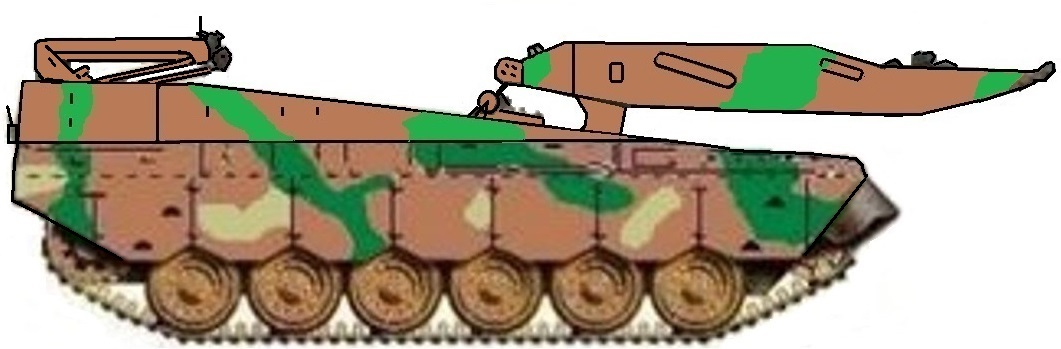
South African Army - Olifant ABL

==== Leguan on Olifant ====
South Africa (N/A)
The Olifant ABL tank chassis is used as a Leguan AVLB by the South African Army.

==== Leguan on PT-91 Twardy ====
Malaysia (5)

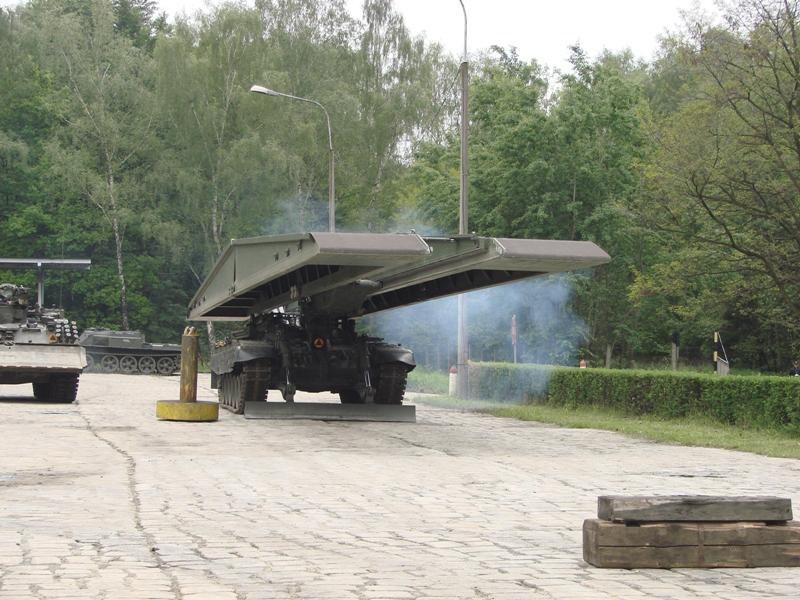
Malaysian Army - PMC Leguan

The PT-91 Twardy is a Polish made upgrade of the T-72M1 MBT.
Malaysia purchased a variant of the PT-91M equipped with the Leguan system, and bought 5 of them, they are known as the PMC Leguan.

=== Operators of truck-based systems ===
==== Leguan on MAN KAT1 ====
Indonesia (N/A)
The Indonesian Navy Marine Corps Engineers operates the MAN KAT 1 8×8-based Leguan. The system was presented to the public in October 1995. The quantity purchased isn't officially communicated.
Netherlands (10 second-hand from Norway)

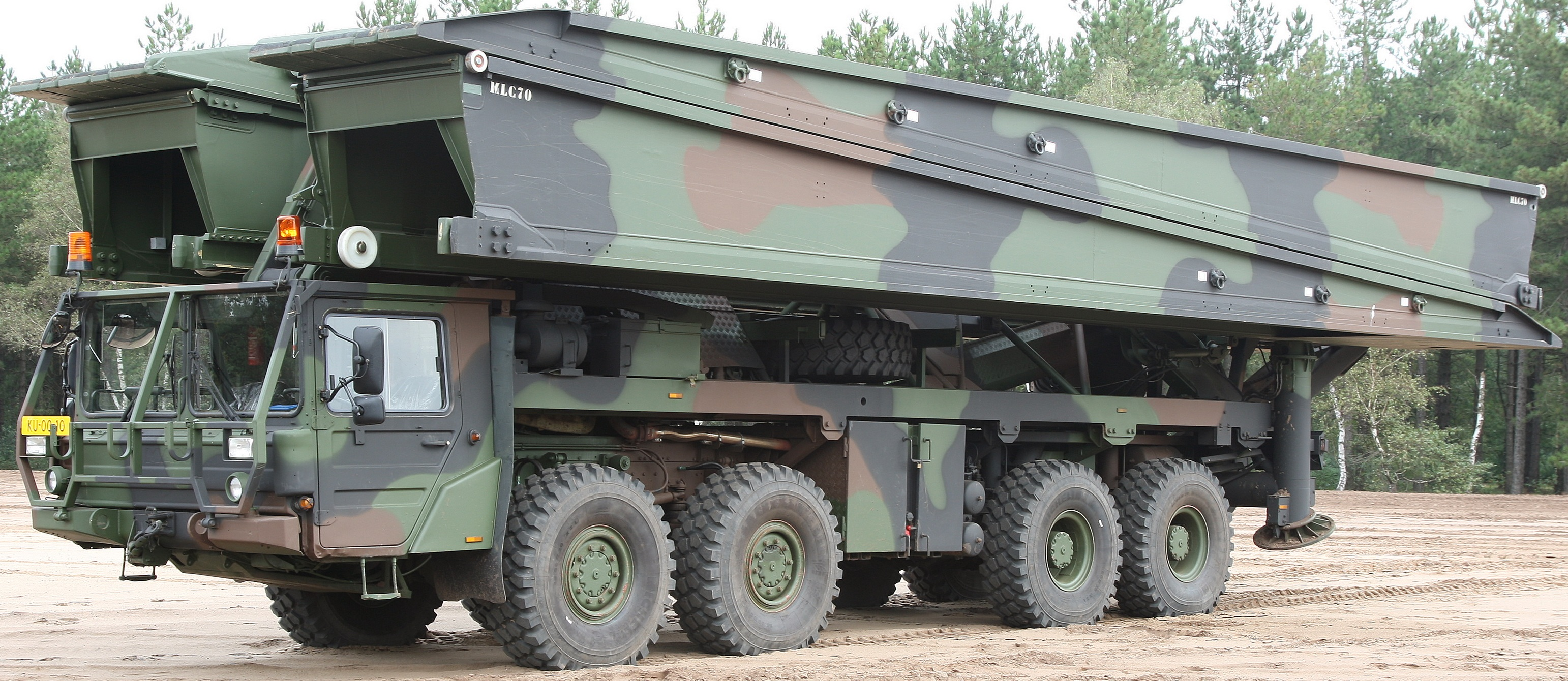
Royal Netherlands Army - MAN Leguan bridge layer

The Netherlands purchased 10 second-hand systems from Norway as an interim solution, until the Leopard 2 based Leguan were purchased.
The systems is now retired.
Norway (27)
Orders of the Norwegian Ministry of Defence:
- 1987:
  - 14 × Leguan based on the all-terrain truck MAN-OAF 36.422 VFAE 8×8
  - 28 × 26-meter bridges
  - Option: 13 bridge-layers and 26 bridges
- 1997: option converted into a firm contract
  - 13 × Leguan based on the all-terrain truck MAN-OAF 36.422 VFAE 8×8
  - 26 × 26-meter bridges
Norway sold 10 systems to the Netherlands.
Singapore (N/A)
Sources confirm the use of this variant by Singapore.
Venezuela (10)
The Venezuelan Army purchased 10 Leguan AVLB systems, and refurbished them in the early 2020s.

==== Leguan on Sisu E15 ====
Finland

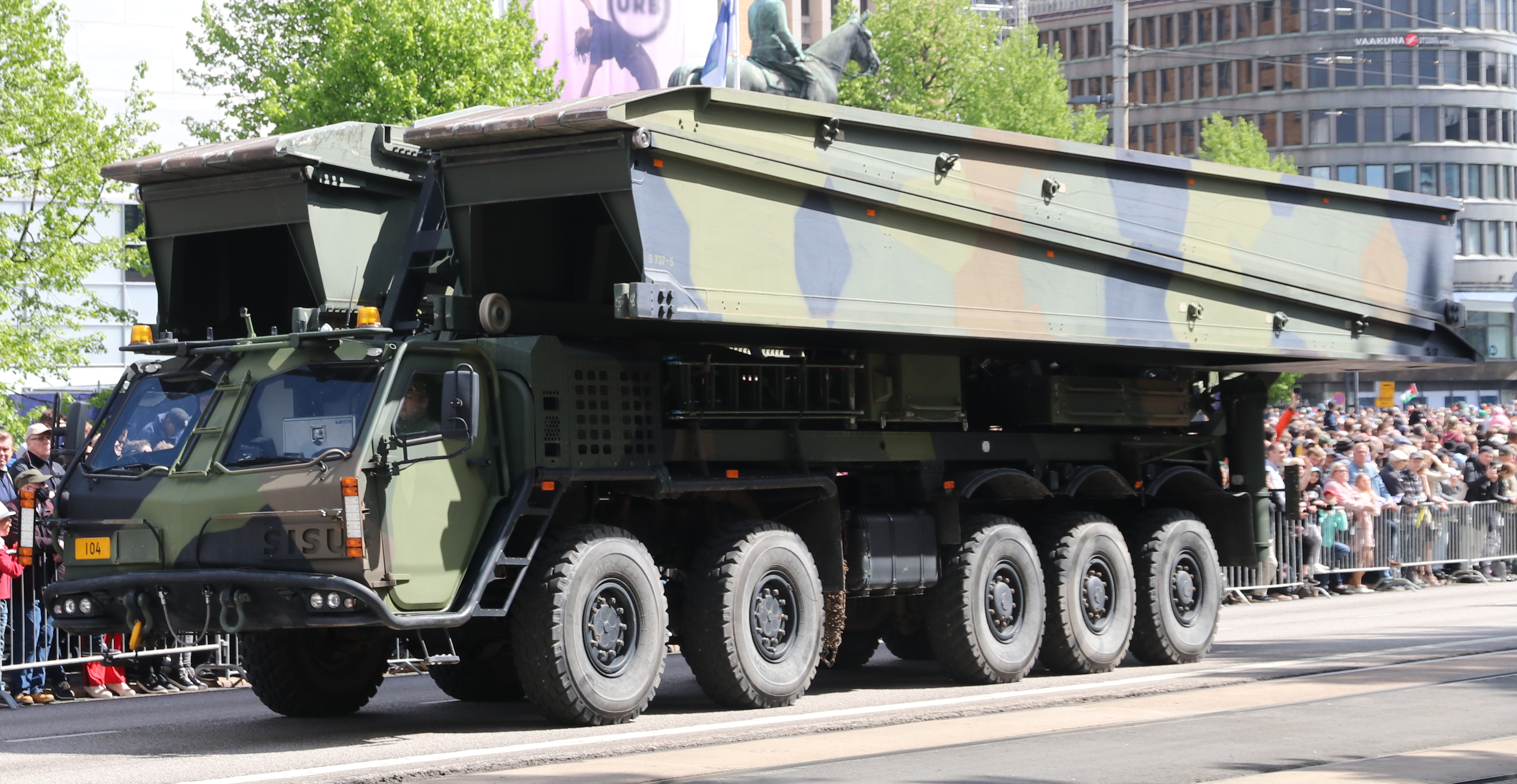
Finnish Army - Sisu E15TP-L bridge layer

The Finnish Army operates a Leopard 2-based variant of the Leguan bridging system, and a truck-based variant. The truck based variant is based on a Sisu E13TP that was extended to a 10×10 configuration, and is locally known as the Sisu E15TP-L. Although the truck is supplied by Sisu, and the bridging system is supplied by KNDS Deutschland, this variant was developed by Patria.
The Finnish Army ordered the system in multiple tranches:
- 9 supplied between 2004 et 2008 In 2018, a contract was signed to bring modifications to the system in order to enable the use of the 14-meter bridges.

=== Future operators ===
==== Systems on order ====
Belgium (8)

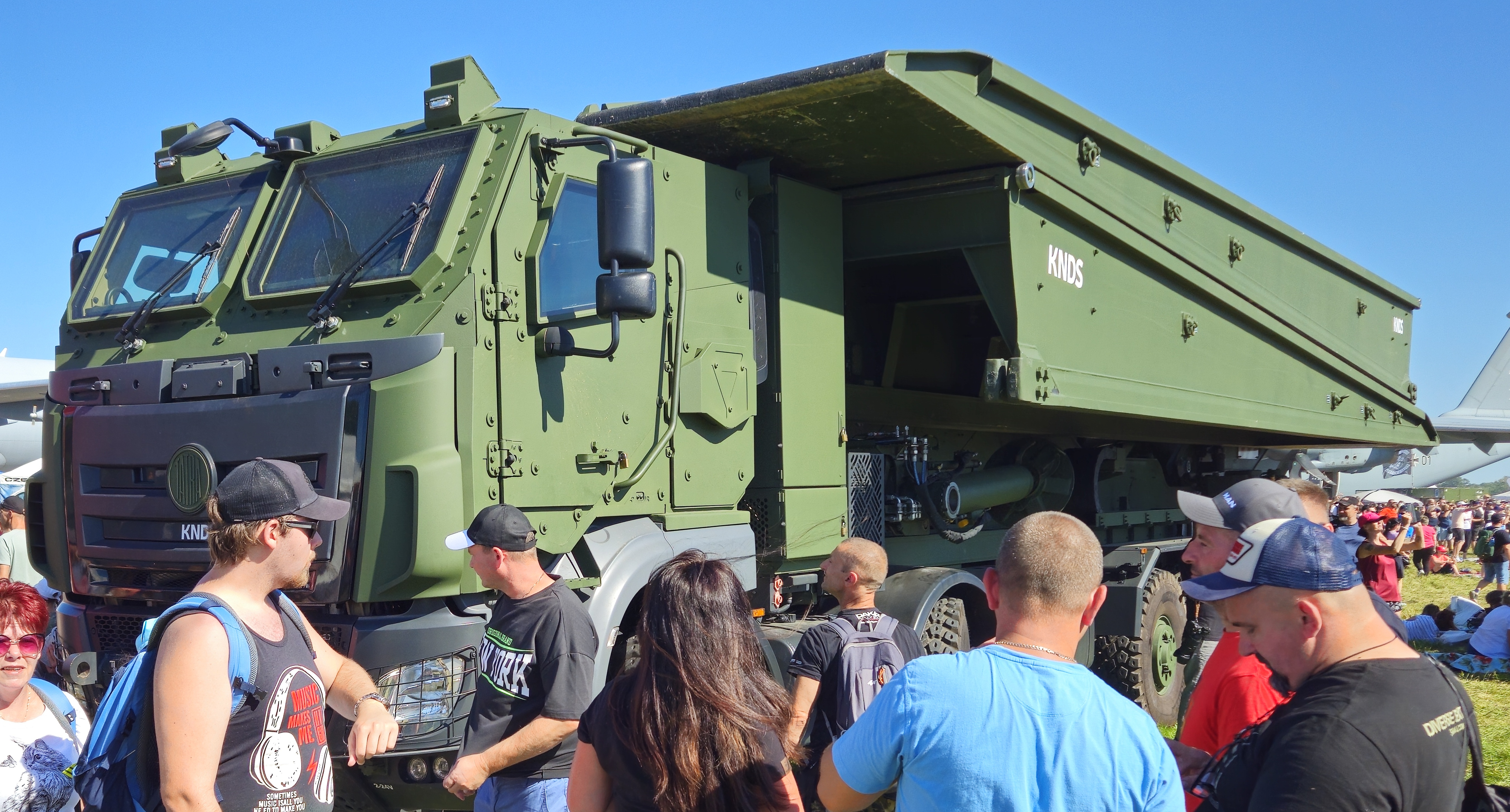
Tatra Phoenix 10×10 Leguan bridgelayer

Belgium selected the Leguan bridging system based on the Tatra Phoenix 10×10 in January 2026.
The contract is worth €80 million, and includes:
- 8 × Tatra Phoenix 10×10 bridge layers
- 17 × 26-meter bridges
Denmark (3 + 3 in option)
Denmark ordered the Leguan bridging system based on the Tatra Phoenix 10×10 in December 2025.
The contract is worth €33 million, and includes:
- 3 × Tatra Phoenix 10×10 bridge layers
Lithuania
Lithuania ordered 44 Leopard 2A8 in December 2024. In January 2026, Lithuania ordered 12 Leguan systems based on the Leopard 2 in order to support their operation. The order includes:
- 12 × Leopard 2 Leguan
- 12 × 26-meter bridges
- 12 × 2 14-meter bridges
- Transport trucks for the additional bridges

==== Potential orders ====
Czech Republic
KNDS Deutschland mentioned in December 2026 that Czechia interested. The Czech Army is already a client of the Leopard 2A8, and manufactures the hulls of the Leopard 2 tanks.
Germany
As part of the Brückensysteme Rad MKr programme, Germany is planning to purchase a bridge layer for its medium forces. KNDS Deutschland offers the Boxer bridgelayer and the Tatra Phoenix.
GDELS Bridge Systems is competing with its Anaconda system (1 × 22-meter or 2 × 12-meter) based on the RMMV HX2 trucks (8×8 or 10×10).
Italy
Italy has initiated the purchase of a new generation of tanks. The project includes the purchase of 132 MBT, 140 support tanks, and an unknown number of light tanks.
The project resulted in a collaboration between Leonardo and Rheinmetall, who created a consortium, LRMV (Leonardo Rheinmetall Military Vehicles). The vehicles selected are the KF41 Lynx that will be the base for the light tanks. The MBT and support tanks will be based on the KF51 Panther.
Among the support tank, Italy plans to purchase ARV, AEV, AVLB, and potentially MCV. The Leguan could be selected to be used by the Italian Army.
Spain (32)
Spain approved a budget for 32 AVLB in September 2025. In November 2025, a contract was signed with Indra. The aim is to supply bridgelayers to the VCR Dragon combat units with 24-metre bridges. The Leguan could be selected.
