= DRDO Sarvatra =

Sarvatra Bridge System
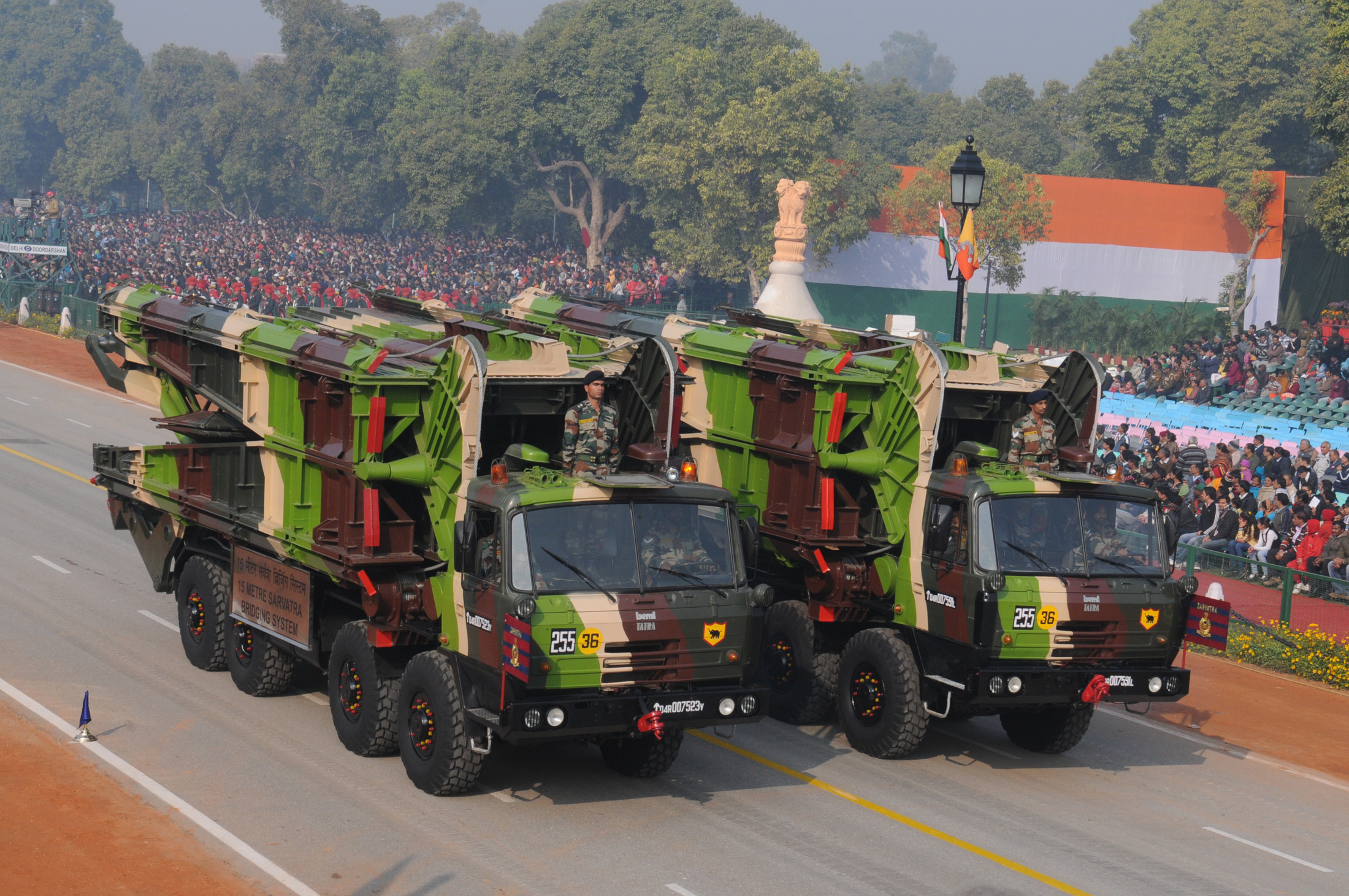
- Sarvatra Bridging System at Republic Day
- Type: Armored vehicle-launched bridge
- Place of origin: India

Service history
- In service: 2000–present

Production history
- Designer: Armament and Combat Engineering Systems; Research & Development Establishment (Engineers)
- Manufacturer: BEML; Dantal Hydraulics; Larsen and Toubro; Oscar Equipments
- No. built: 50
- Variants: 15M Sarvatra Bridge System; 20M Sarvatra Bridge System

Specifications
- Length: 15 metres (49 ft 3 in); 20 metres (65 ft 7 in)
- Width: 4 m (13 ft 1 in)
- Height: 2.6 m (8 ft 6 in) to 6 m (19 ft 8 in) (adjustable)
- Crew: 4
- Engine: TVML T 3-B / T 3-C series V8 turbocharged multi-fuel with intercooler 235 horsepower (175 kW) to 368 horsepower (274 kW)
- Payload capacity: 1× scissors-type folding bridge (22 tonne)
- Transmission: Non-synchronized manual, 10 forward + 2 reverse gears
- Suspension: Leaf spring and air suspension with telescopic shock absorbers
- Operational range: ~800 km
- Maximum speed: 80 km/h (50 mph) to 90 km/h (56 mph)

The DRDO Sarvatra (lit. 'Everywhere') also known as Sarvatra Multi-span Mobile Bridge System is a truck-mounted, multi-span, mobile bridging system developed by Armament and Combat Engineering Systems (ACE) and Research and Development Establishment (R&DE) Engineers of Defence Research and Development Organisation (DRDO) for the Indian army. Its production public company is Bharat Earth Movers Limited (BEML), Bangalore.

== Design ==
The Sarvatra is a 75-meter, multi-span, mobile bridging system consisting of five scissor bridges made of aluminium alloy with a span of 15 meters, each mounted on a separate mobile platform. Each mobile platform is a modified Tatra T-815 VVN 8 x 8 chassis, drivable from both ends from a small cabin with required driving controls. Further, a microprocessor based control system is utilised to deploy and operationalise the system in less than 2.5 hours.

When the scissors bridge is opened, it is fitted with adjustable trestles to enable multiple units to be used to bridge wet and dry gaps. Five sections provide a total bridge length of 75 m, and four meters in width. The bridge is launched/recovered from either end. With the help of telescopic legs, the height of the bridge can be adjusted from 2.5 m to 6 m to reduce visibility.

The Sarvatra project was sanctioned in 1994 and completed development in October 1999 at a total cost of ₹230,000,000. It was approved for production in March 2000 after trials. The Sarvatra was to replace the East European PMS Bridges in the Indian army, which requires 57 Tatra vehicles to bridge 100 meters. In contrast, the Sarvatra, with just five sections, bridges 75 meters. At ₹600,000,000 per set, the PMS costs almost three times as much as a Sarvatra.

A 20 m variant of Sarvatra bridge system capable of bridging a gap of 100 meters has also been developed.

== Operators ==
India

- Indian Army : 110 units (22 sets) of 15M Sarvatra Bridge System variant on order.

== Specifications ==
- Load Class: MLC–70
- Single Span Length:
  - 15 m
  - 20 m
- Multi-Span Capability:
  - 75 m
  - 100 m
- Roadway Width: 3.45 m during transportation; 4 m during use
- Span Height: 2.6 m to 6 m
- Construction time: 15 minutes
- Crew: 1 specialized driver + 3 combat engineers

== See also ==
- Vijayanta
- Kartik BLT- A model of the Vijayanta
