= Bridge plate =

Bridge plate may refer to:

- Bridge plate (marking), markings on military vehicles to indicate the weight
- Bridge plate (mechanism), equipment used by some light rail vehicles to provide wheelchair access
- A metal or wood plate making up part of the bridge on some stringed instruments.
