= ANDROS =

Military and police robot designed by REMOTEC, a subsidiary of Northrop Grumman

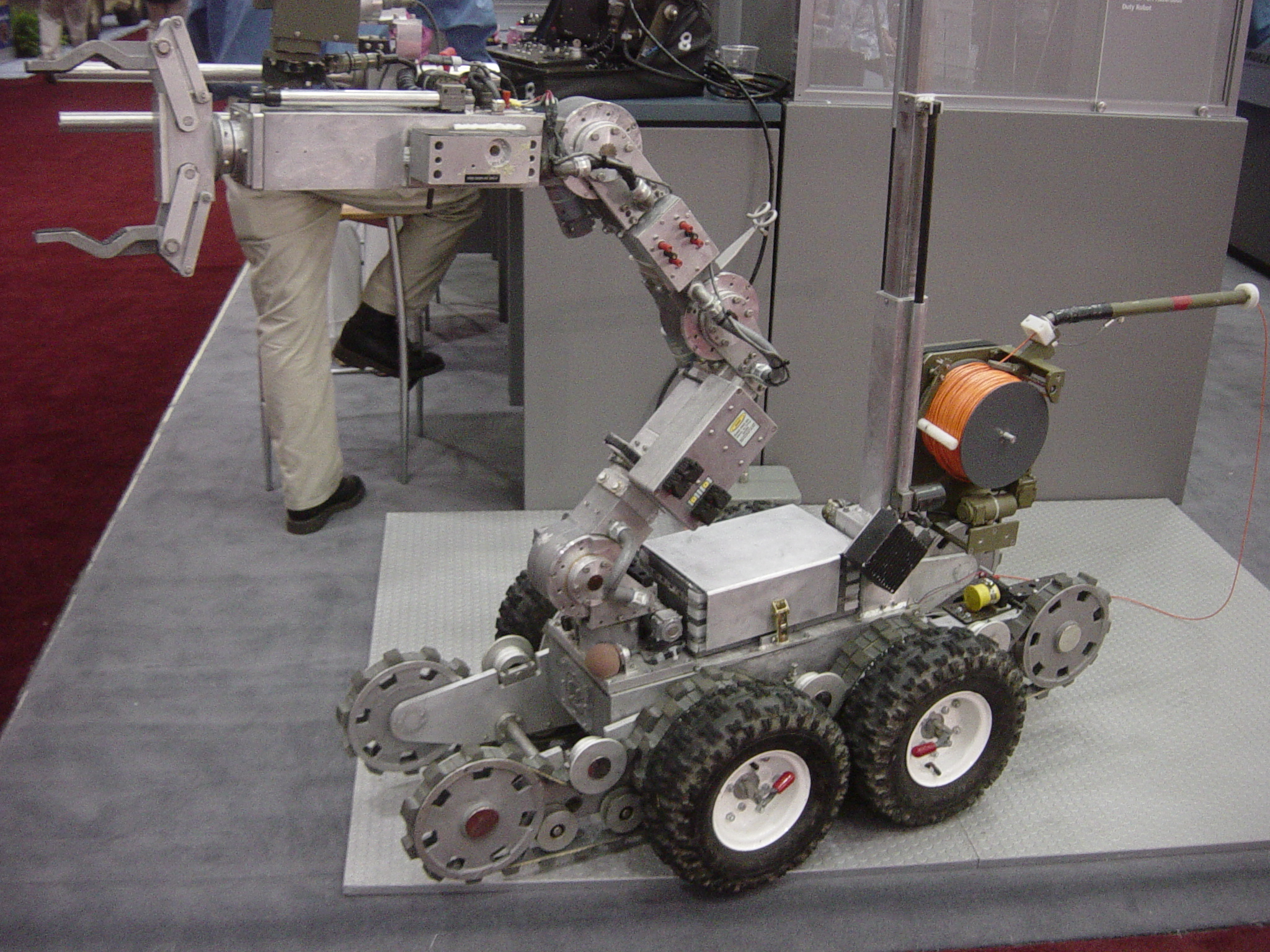
ANDROS F6A on display at AUVSI 2005

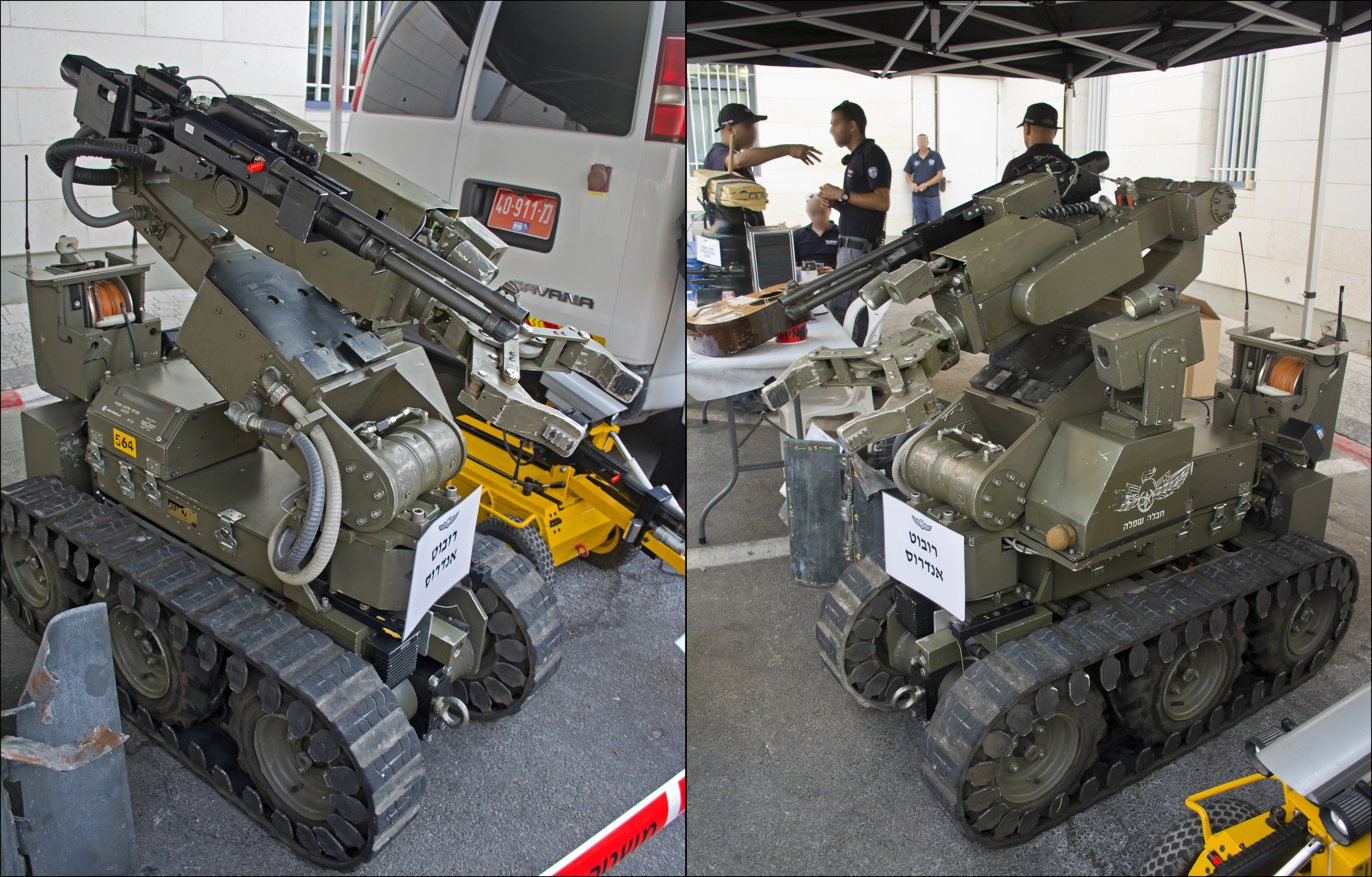
Israeli Police ANDROS Wolverine

The ANDROS is a series of remote control military robots designed by REMOTEC, a subsidiary of Northrop Grumman. The ANDROS series is primarily designed for military, explosive ordnance disposal (EOD), and law enforcement or SWAT applications. The ANDROS gained notability in 2016 for being involved in the first instance of a robot being used to kill another person, Micah Xavier Johnson, the gunman involved in the 2016 shooting of Dallas police officers.

== Variants ==
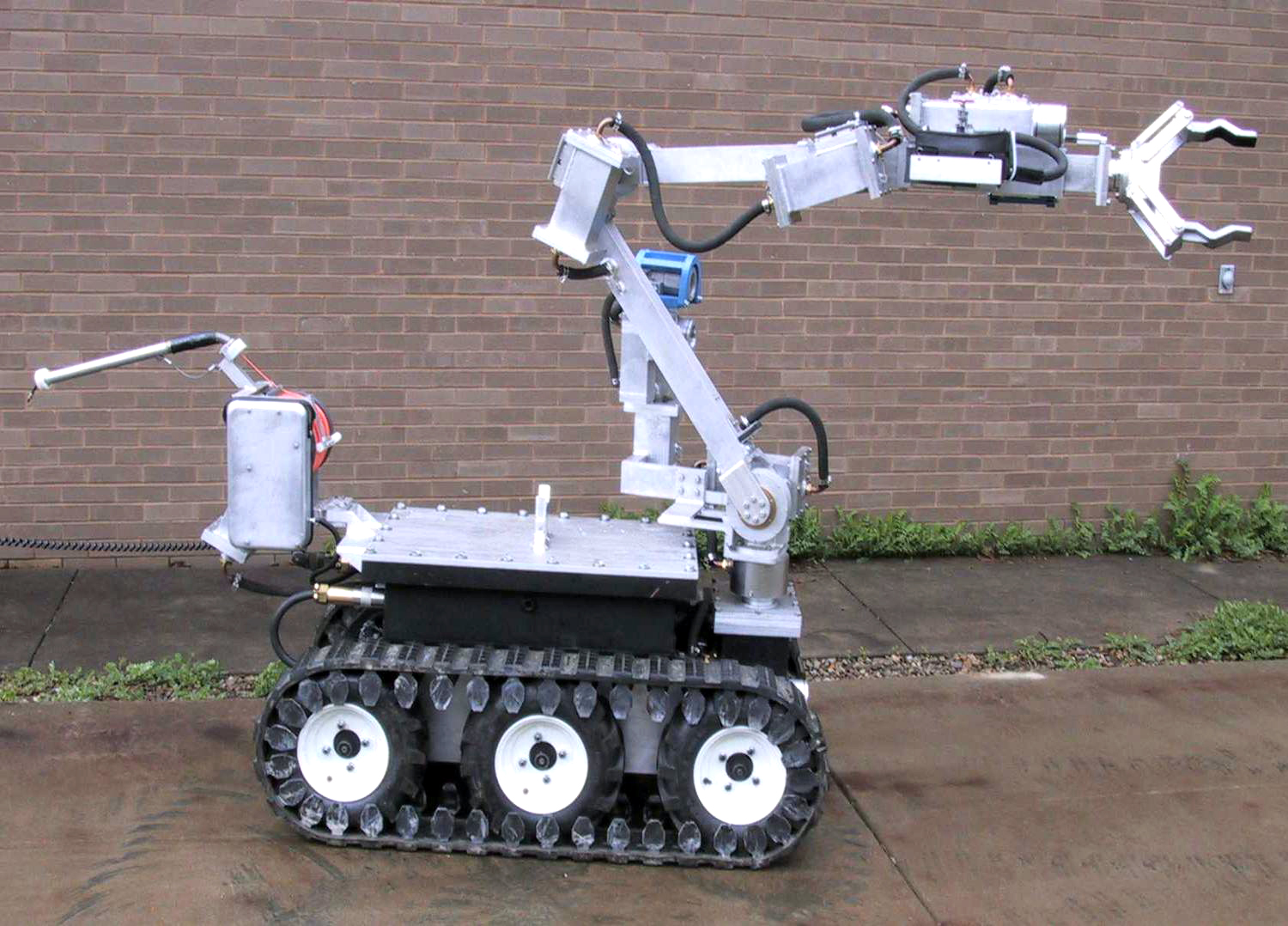
ANDROS Wolverine V2 used by MSHA in the Sago Mine response.

The robot is made in the following variants:

- F6-A is the basic variant. Its dimensions are 52" x 29" x 56.5" (L X W X H), it weighs 485 lbs, has 4 cameras, and a manipulator arm capable of lifting 25 lbs at full extension.
  - An earlier variant, the F-5, was used to kill the perpetrator of the 2016 shooting of Dallas police officers.
- MarkV-A1 has a similar design to the F6-A model, but is appreciably larger with a weight of 790 lbs.
- Mini ANDROS-II is a smaller variation of the design. Its dimensions are 53" x 24.5" x 27" (L X W X H) and it has a weight of 225 lbs.
- Wolverine is a wheeled and optionally tracked design and is the largest in the ANDROS family at 810 lbs.
- Wolverine V2 is a mine-permissible variant of the Wolverine for use by the Mine Safety and Health Administration. With the added safety equipment, the V2 weighs 1200 lbs. The V2 was a custom design and is not offered for sale with the other models.
- HD-1 is wheeled and optionally tracked like the Wolverine, but is the smallest (and newest) ANDROS variant, weighing 200 lbs.
