= HPD series of mines =

Series of anti-tank mines

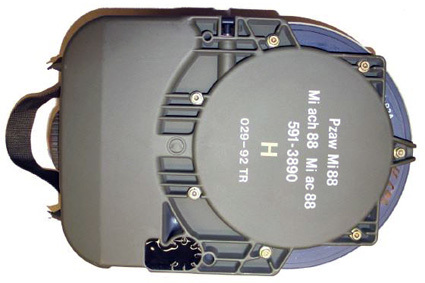
HPD-2 mine used by the Swiss Army

The HPD-1, HPD-2 and HPD-3 are a series of French electrically fuzed anti-tank landmines of TDA Armements that use Misnay–Schardin effect warheads. The entire series of mines conform to the United States MIL-STD-331.

== HPD-1 ==
The HPD-1 consists of a large case with a prominent circular section at one end that contains the clearing charge and Misnay–Schardin effect warhead, and a rectangular section that contains the batteries and seismic and magnetic sensors that the electronic fuze uses. It was developed to be laid automatically from the Matenin minelayer or by hand.

When the seismic sensor detects a suitable target, the magnetic sensor is then activated and when a vehicle with a mass of more than eight tons passes over the mine, the magnetic sensor triggers the mine’s warhead. First the mine detonates a clearing charge, which removes any earth that may have been laid over the mine, then it triggers the Misnay–Schardin effect charge, which projects a slug of metal upwards. In testing, the mine penetrated up to 100 millimeters of armour, although it can officially penetrate only 70 millimeters.

== HPD-2 ==
The HPD-2 is a development of the HPD-1 mine. It incorporates a series of enhancements to both the warhead and fuzing mechanism. The mine's warhead is said to be a "second generation" Misnay–Schardin effect design capable of penetrating up to 150 millimeters of armour. In addition it can be laid in up to one and half meters of water.

The mine arms itself after an initial delay of ten minutes and self-neutralizes after 30 days. It also incorporates an anti-handling device, which is sensitive to motion and the signals produced by mine detectors.

As of 2006, approximately 400,000 HPD-2 series mines have been ordered. The mine is in service with the French Army, and is sold to the Belgian and Norwegian armed forces. It is in licence production in Switzerland for the Swiss Army as Panzerabwehrmine 88 (Pzaw Mi 88).

== HPD-3 ==
The HPD-3 is a further development of the HPD-2 featuring a programmable fuze. It has a three pin interface for a programming device. It can be set for an active period of either 30 days after which it self-neutralizes or for a shorter active period of between four and ninety six hours after which it self-destructs.

== Service history ==
The HDP-2A2 mine has been supplied to Ukraine. On 7 November, Russian State Duma Deputy Alexander Borodai almost died when his car was nearly struck by a French HPD-2A2 in the Kherson region. The security vehicle in front of his was reportedly hit by the land mine, blowing out windows and tyres. Video showed a camouflaged HPD-2A2 which his own vehicle missed by "millimetres".

== Specification ==
	HPD-1	HPD-F2	HPD-3
Length	280 mm		
Width	189 mm		
Height	104 mm		
Weight	6.1 kg	7.2 kg	7.2 kg
Explosive content	3.8 kg of Hexolite	3.3 kg of Hexolite	3.3 kg of Hexolite

== Variants ==
- HPD-1
- HPD-2
- HPD-F2
- HPD-2A
- HPD-3
- HPD-3P
