= Adrushy mine-II =

Anti-tank mine

Adrushy (A/T influence) Mk-II is an Indian anti-tank mine that features a shaped charge and a magnetic influence fuze. The mine is capable of discriminating between tanks and tank trawls using a sensor employing mutual induction.

== Design ==
The mine is an "intelligent" mine with an onboard microprocessor that discriminates between friend and foe using both analog and digital signals. The explosive can penetrate more than 85mm of RHA, while conversely the mine itself can survive the blast from a mine-clearing line charge at 2.5 meters.

== Features ==
- 85mm of RHA penetration
- Full width attack capability
- Tank trawl discrimination
- Reusable with three field-settable activity periods of 10, 40 and 80 days.
- Resistant to mine-clearing line charges at 2.5 meters.
- Electronic and mechanical safeties.

== Specifications ==
- Length: 330mm
- Width: 240mm
- Height: 140mm
- Total weight: 7.6kg
- Explosive: 2.3kg
- Body: 10% GRP polycarbonate
- Linear: Copper
- Battery cells: LiSOCI2 (Lithium thionyl-chloride)

== See also ==
- Drdo Self Propelled Mine Burier
