= MarkV-A1 =

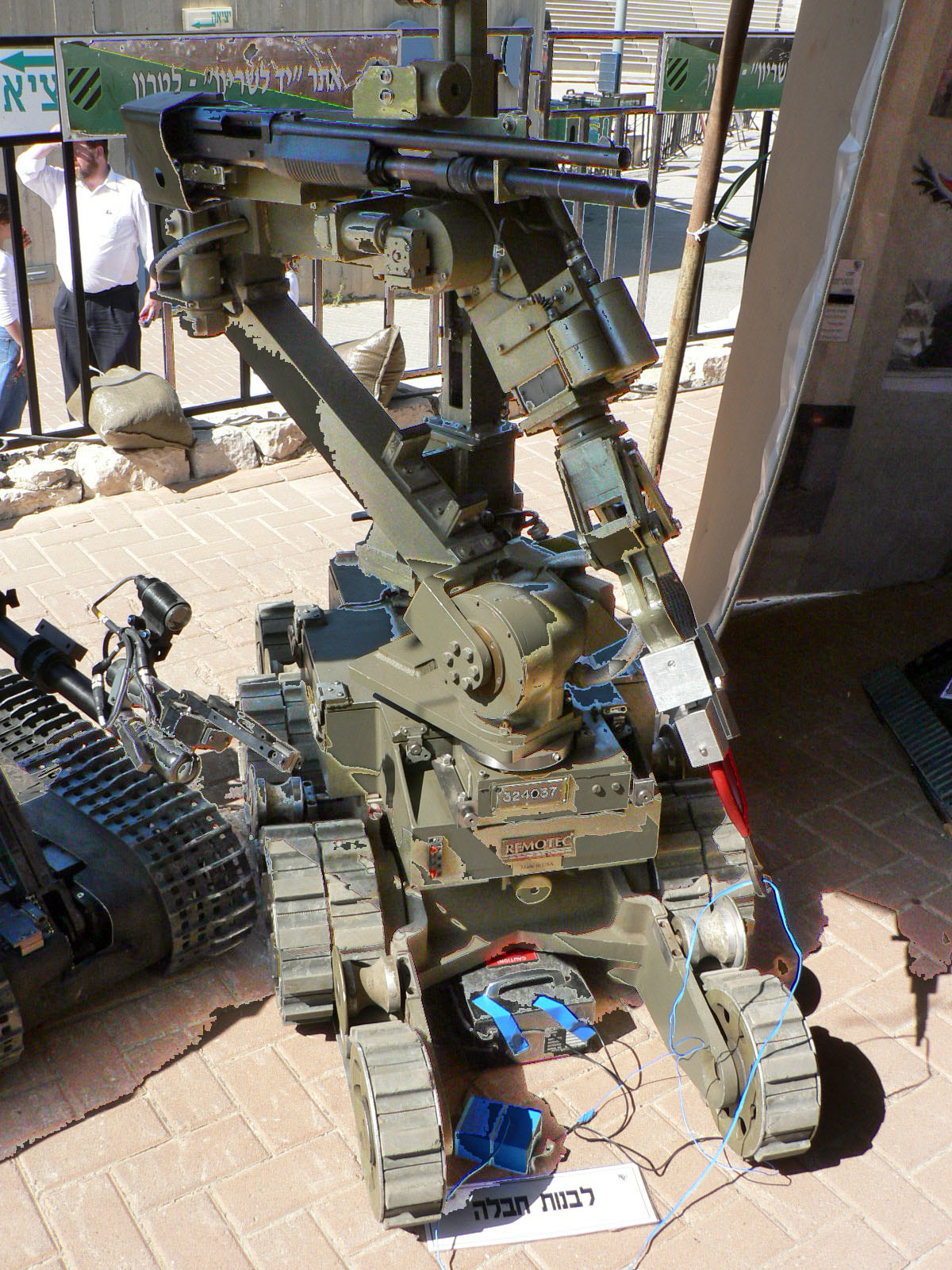
IDF American Andros EOD robot. This particular model is the MarkV-A1

MarkV-A1 or Mark5-A1 is a bomb disposal robot designed by Northrop Grumman for the purpose of handling potential explosives without risking any lives. It is part of the Remotec ANDROS line, which includes other robotic EODs (Explosive Ordnance Disposal). First responders around the world depend on the MarkV to handle potential hazards and explosives from outside the danger zone. Typically, police forces and departments in large cities have a designated bomb squad or unit for the purpose of handling potential explosives as well as hazardous materials or threats; and the MarkV is a technological feat that several of these units have in their arsenal for exactly that reason.

This particular model was utilized by the Dallas Police Department to kill a gunman who murdered five police officers on July 7, 2016. Officers used the robot to deliver a charge of C4 which was then detonated next to the gunman.

== History ==
The MarkV-A1 was designed and released by Northrop Grumman Corporation in 2004. Remotec has worked with the United States military for over 25 years to protect civilians; the MarkV-A1 has been one of the tools used for this purpose. The DRDO Daksh and the Wheelbarrow (robot) have similar applications. MarkV can handle and defuse explosives, hazardous waste and other materials. Remotec ANDROS are new customized models. Today, the MarkV-A1 is used by the Explosive Ordnance Disposal (EOD), Law Enforcement/SWAT, HazMat and other first responders. The MarkV-A1 costs about $180,000.

== Design ==
The robot is equipped with the following key features:

- Color Surveillance camera with light, 72:1 zoom, pan/tilt, low light switching capability
- Gripper with continuous rotate - Many accessories can be added to work with the gripper
- Quick disconnect camera mount
- 24-inch camera extender
- Manipulator arm that can reach up to 8 feet in the air
- 2-way audio system with weatherproof speaker and microphone mounted on the robot
- Powered by 24VDC - Two 65 amp-hr 12VDC spiral-cell batteries

In addition, the MarkV-A1 also comes standard with several mission mounts and sensor mounts for additional accessories that serve specific purposes when needed.

In order to operate the Remotec Andros MarkV-A1 has a control unit that contains a 15-inch LCD screen. In time dependent, the robot can be operated solely off of visual feedback provided by its cameras. In total, the MarkV-A1 has four color video cameras, including a camera mounted on one of the poles protruding from the top of the robot. It also features several microphones, lights, and an array of other sensors. The MarkV-A1 can be operated via one of the three following methods:

- Fiber optic cable – deployed from the vehicle
- Wireless radio control
- Hard tether cable

The MarkV weighs approximately 800 pounds with only its standard features, and its extendable camera can reach up to 6 feet in the air.

=== Mobility ===
Due to its size, the MarkV-A1's top speed is only 3.5 mph, but speed is not a necessity for a bomb disposal robot. It can, however travel up inclines to about 45 degrees, and has the capability to ascend and descend staircases. The tread system is designed to traverse difficult terrain and the quick-release wheels and tracks allow it to be highly versatile, giving it the ability to clear openings down to 24" and obstacles up to 16" tall, as well as mud and ditches.

== Accessories ==
Oftentimes first responders, such as EOD, SWAT, law enforcement or HazMat, need specific accessories that apply to a certain mission. Northrop Grumman provides several accessories that can be mounted onto the MarkV-A1 before a mission.

The following are some notable accessories:

- Laser assembly - Helps with aim
- Fiber optic cable reel - This is one method of controlling the MarkV-A1. Useful if radio signals are being interrupted. The cable can extend to 2000 feet.
- Camera/Pan tilt assembly - Adds to the capability of the main camera including 360 degree rotation and better depth perception
- Headset assembly - This allows the operator to receive audio feedback from the robot.
- Shotgun - The MarkV-A1 can be mounted with either a modified 12 gauge Franchi 612 for use as an entry or breaching tool, as well as the Striker 12 shotgun for delivering non-lethal shots
- SL6 mount assembly - Used in conjunction with L6 or L8 grenade launcher
- Claw assembly - Extends the gripper opening by 2 inches
- Window breaker assembly - Delivers a spring-loaded punch with an aluminum block
- Cordless circular saw assembly - Circular saw with its own power supply held in gripper.
- Cordless drill assembly - Drill held in gripper
- Cable cutter assembly - For heavy duty cables, attached to the gripper fingers

== Operators ==
- Uruguayan Army Bomb Squad
- Israel Defense Forces
- Toronto Police Service Emergency Task Force (Toronto Police Service)
- LAPD Bomb Squad
- United States Army
- Dallas Police Department

== See also ==
- DRDO Daksh
- Wheelbarrow (EOD)
- Remotec Andros F6B
- Remotec HD-1
- Remotec Mini-Andors II
- Remotec Wolverine
