= TDA Armements =

TDA Armements SAS was a French defence company, that made widely deployed air-to-ground rockets (sub-metric precision rocket), and now a division of Thales Group.

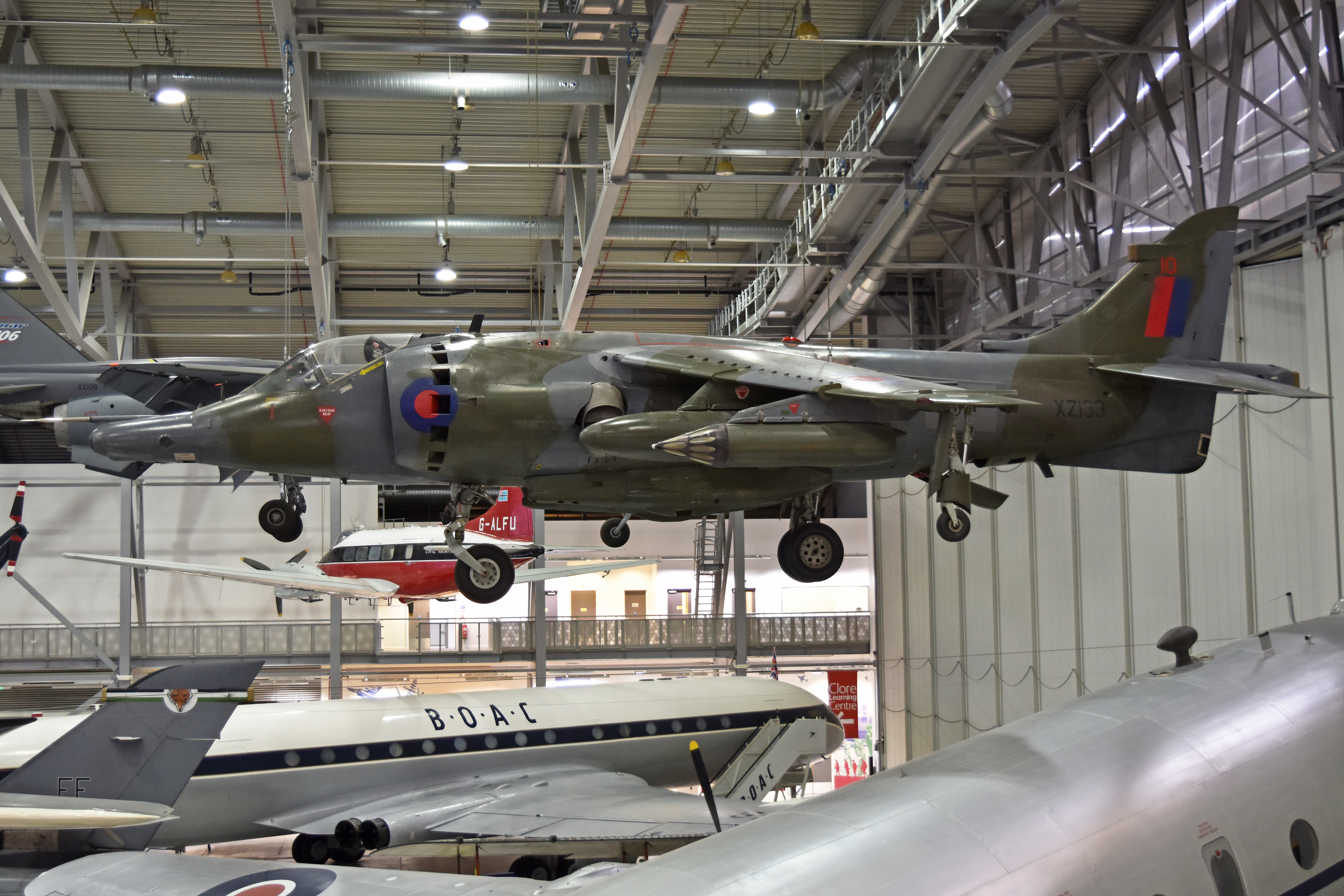
Harrier GR3 XZ133 (built in 1976) carrying the under-wing SNEB rocket pod

== History ==
Its rockets are, and have been, mostly carried by attack helicopters and ground attack aircraft. The modern company was set up in December 1994 as a joint venture of EADS Deutschland and Thales.

In October 2005, Thales Land & Joint Systems bought 100% of the company by buying the 50% share of EADS.

== Structure ==
It is headquartered in La Ferté-Saint-Aubin, in the Loiret department in the Centre-Val de Loire region.

It exports around a half of its products.

== Products ==
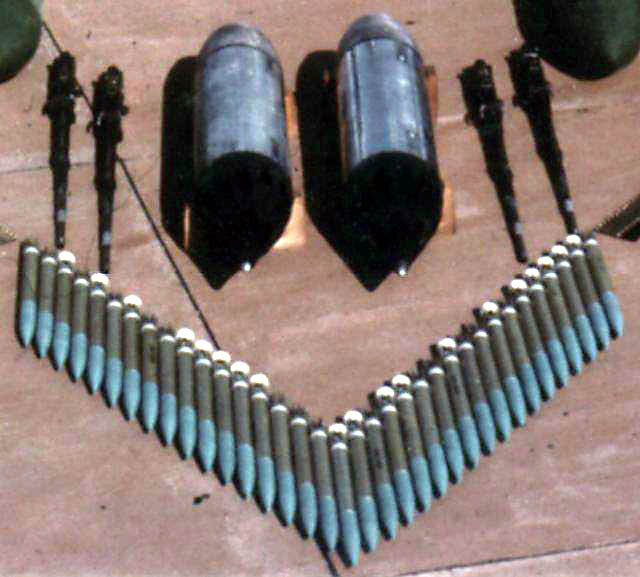
SNEB 68mm rocket system

- Detonation systems
- Equipment for the Crotale (missile), MICA (missile), AS-30 and Aster (missile family)
- SNEB 68mm air to ground rocket system, commonly carried by the Harrier throughout its life

== See also ==
- List of military rockets
- List of missiles of the RAF
- Matra
