= DRDO espionage case =

Indian legal case

- Date: 3 May 2023
- Location: Pune, Maharashtra, India
- Type: Espionage
- Participants: Pradeep Kurulkar
- Outcome: Ongoing investigation

The DRDO espionage case is an ongoing investigation by the Anti-Terrorism Squad (ATS) in Maharashtra, India, into Pradeep Kurulkar, a senior scientist at the Defence Research and Development Organisation (DRDO). It is alleged that the accused scientist, Pradeep Kurulkar who is a director at one of the DRDO labs in Pune, passed confidential information to a Pakistani intelligence operative.

The case is a serious security breach, and it has raised concerns about the safety of India's defence secrets and nuclear weapons.

== Background ==
In February 2023, a senior official of the Defence Research and Development Organisation, who was posted at the DRDO's Integrated Test Range at Chandipur, Balasore district in Odisha, was arrested for allegedly sharing secret information related to India's defence sector with a Pakistani spy, according to the Odisha Police.

== Timeline ==
On 3 May 2023, Kurulkar was arrested following a complaint filed by a senior officer of the DRDO's Vigilance and Security Department. A probe by the DRDO's internal standing committee and a forensic report, found that he had allegedly been in contact with a female Pakistani intelligence operative through WhatsApp messages, voice and video calls. The ATS also seized Kurulkar's electronic devices, which they say contain evidence of him sharing sensitive information with the Pakistani operative.

Kurulkar has been charged under the Official Secrets Act, which carries a maximum sentence of 14 years in prison. He has denied the charges, claiming that he was honey-trapped by the Pakistani operative.

Kurulkar holding a diplomatic passport had allegedly travelled to five to six countries.

On 4 May 2023, he was produced before a special court in Pune where his ATS custody was extended for further probe till 9 May 2023. And again till 15 May 2023.

On 15 May 2023, the special court extended his police custody till 16 May after the prosecution requested that Kurulkar's mobile phone required to be analysed.

On 16 May 2023, the special court remanded DRDO scientist Kurulkar to a 14-day judicial custody till 29 May 2023.

On 30 June 2023, the Maharashtra ATS submitted a 1,837-page chargesheet before a special court.

On 7 December 2023, the Pune District and Sessions court rejected the bail application of Kurulkar.

== See also ==
- ISRO espionage case
