= DRDO Daksh =

Indian bomb disposal robot

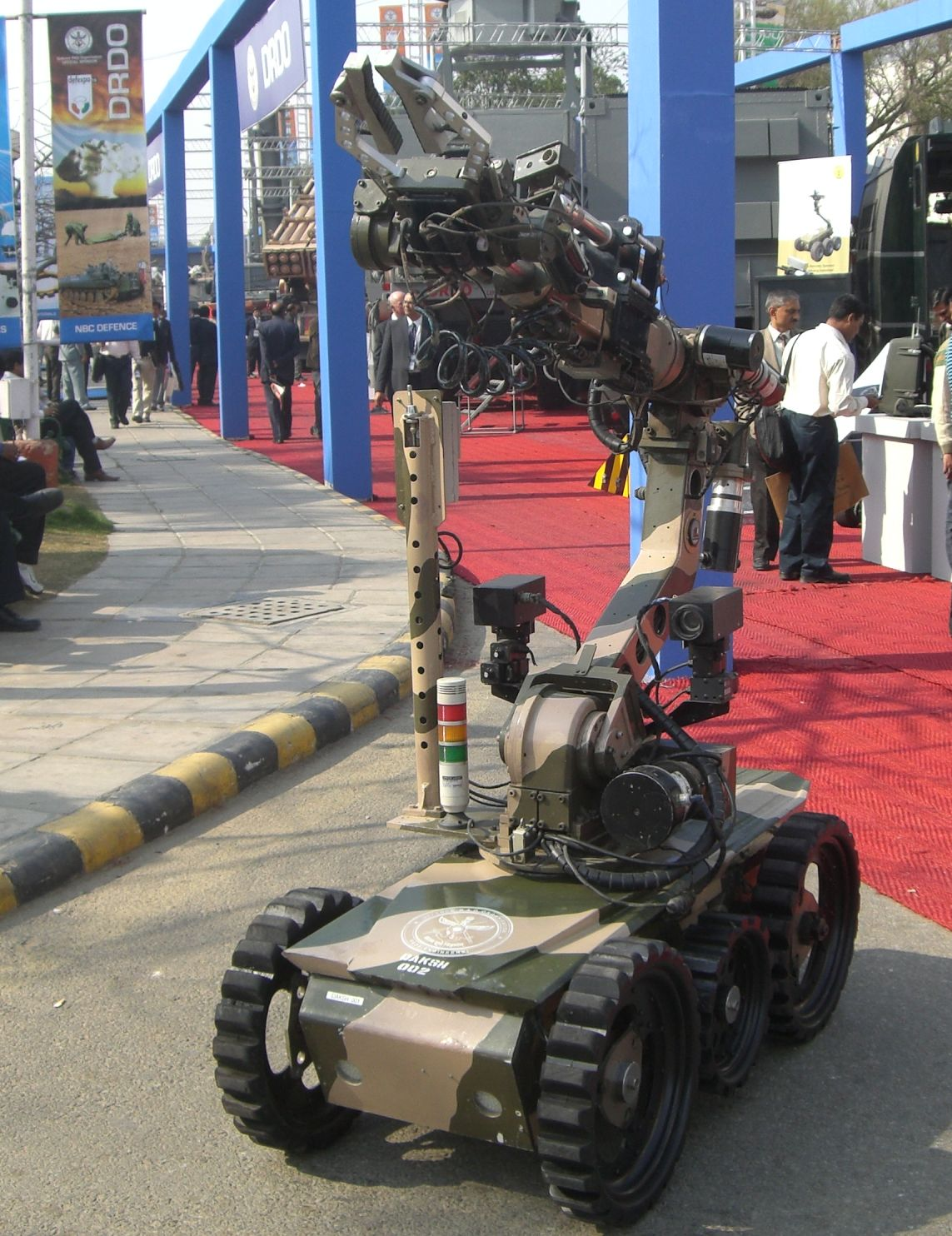
Daksh – Remotely Operated Vehicle developed by DRDO

Daksh (lit. 'Dexterous') is an electrically powered and remotely controlled robot used for locating, handling and destroying hazardous objects safely. It was designed and developed by Research & Development Establishment (Engineers) in collaboration with Tata Motors, Theta Controls, Bharat Electronics, and Dynalog India.

At a cost of ₹3.50 crore (US$363,449), the project was finished by May 2005 after a 30-month development period. Daksh costs ₹80 lakh per unit, while the carrying vehicle costs ₹25 lakh.

== Variants ==
=== Daksh Mini ===
Daksh mini is a lightweight version developed for confined space operations. it is designed for use in aircraft, trains, and buses where larger bomb dosposal robots may face mobility limitations.

=== Daksh Scout ===
Daksh scout is a compact reconnaissance and explosive handling robot developed for rapid deployment and surveillance operations.

== Description ==
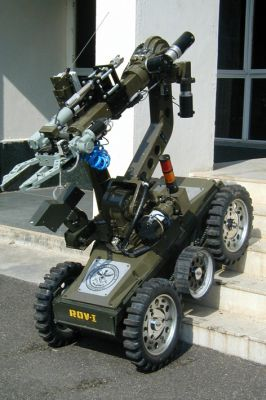
DRDO Daksh ROV

Daksh is a battery-operated remote-controlled robot on wheels that was created with a primary function of bomb recovery. It is fully automated. It can navigate staircases, negotiate steep slopes, navigate narrow corridors and tow vehicles to reach hazardous materials. Using its robotized arm, it can lift a suspect object and scan it using its portable X-Ray device. If the object is a bomb, Daksh can defuse it with its water jet disrupter. It has a shotgun, which can break open locked doors, and it can scan cars for explosives. With a master control station (MCS), it can be remotely controlled over a range of 500 m in line of sight or within buildings. Ninety per cent of the robot's components are indigenous. The Army has also placed limited series production orders for 20 Dakshs.

It has ladder climbing abilities and can function for three continuous hours, with the capability to operate over distances exceeding 100 to 500 metres. It serves the bomb disposal units (BDU) of army, police, and paramilitary forces, aiding in handling IEDs and other dangerous substances. The ROV Daksh features a motorized pan-tilt platform and can be controlled remotely within a 500-meter range.

The first batch of five units was handed over to General Combat Engineers, on 19 December 2011. The technology has been transferred for production to three firms, Dynalog India, Theta Controls, and Bharat Electronics.

== Total Containment Vessels ==
- Fully automated
- Can neutralise NBC weapons
- Has radio frequency shield to jam remote signals for triggering a blast.
- The ROV is versatile equipment for improvised explosive device identification and handling. It can also be utilised to survey and monitor nuclear and chemical contamination levels.
- The ROV has 40° incline stair climbing capabilities and can operate continuously for 3 hours.
- The ROV can be controlled either by fibre optic communication over 100m distance or can be controlled by wireless communication over 500m line of sight.
- Carry 20 kg of weight and has a 2.5-meter arm reach. Another 4-meter reach with an arm extension.
- Communicate photos to the master control by X-ray imaging. Master control supports real-time image transmission and display, as well as command and control.
- A water jet disrupter mounted atop to disarm explosives in any situation. Uses a diode laser pointer for precise aiming and remote shooting. Can pierce half-inch thick plywood at a distance of 3-meter when 100 milliliters of water are added.
- Two front and rear cameras with 22x optical zoom and focus.

== Operator ==
- Indian Army

== See also ==
- Unmanned ground vehicle
- MarkV-A1
