= Bridge plate (marking) =

Marking on Allied military vehicles

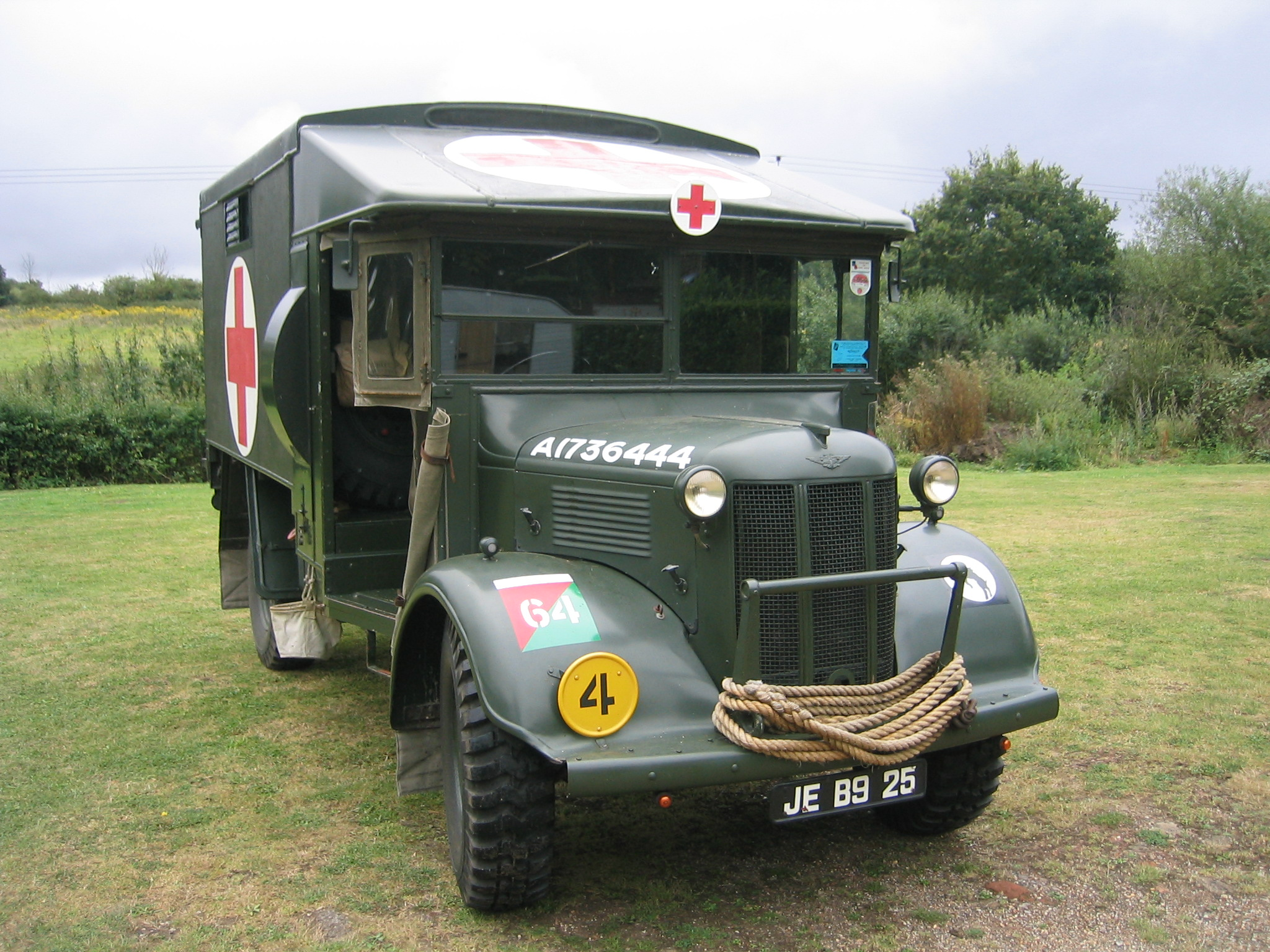
Austin K2/Y ambulance with prominent circular yellow bridge plate. The number ("4") indicates the loaded weight of the vehicle in tons

Bridge Plates are markings used on Allied vehicles beginning in World War II that indicate the weight of the vehicle in tons as well as the weight classification of the vehicle. This was used to calculate whether a vehicle, or series of vehicles, could safely cross a bridge with a given rating.

While originally designed by the British as an affixed metal plate that was yellow in colour, later in the war (and afterwards) it was commonplace to simply paint the number onto a vehicle whose weight was unlikely to change.

While simple in idea, the actual classification is complicated by being based not only on gross vehicle weight, but on whether the vehicle is wheeled or tracked, the number of axles, axle spacing, vehicle speed, the number of lanes the vehicle uses and whether or not the vehicle could be hauling a trailer.

These markings (or plates) were typically found on the right front fender or in the area of the right front headlamp.

== See also ==
- Bailey bridge
