= Military Load Classification =

NATO standards classifying how much weight a road can carry

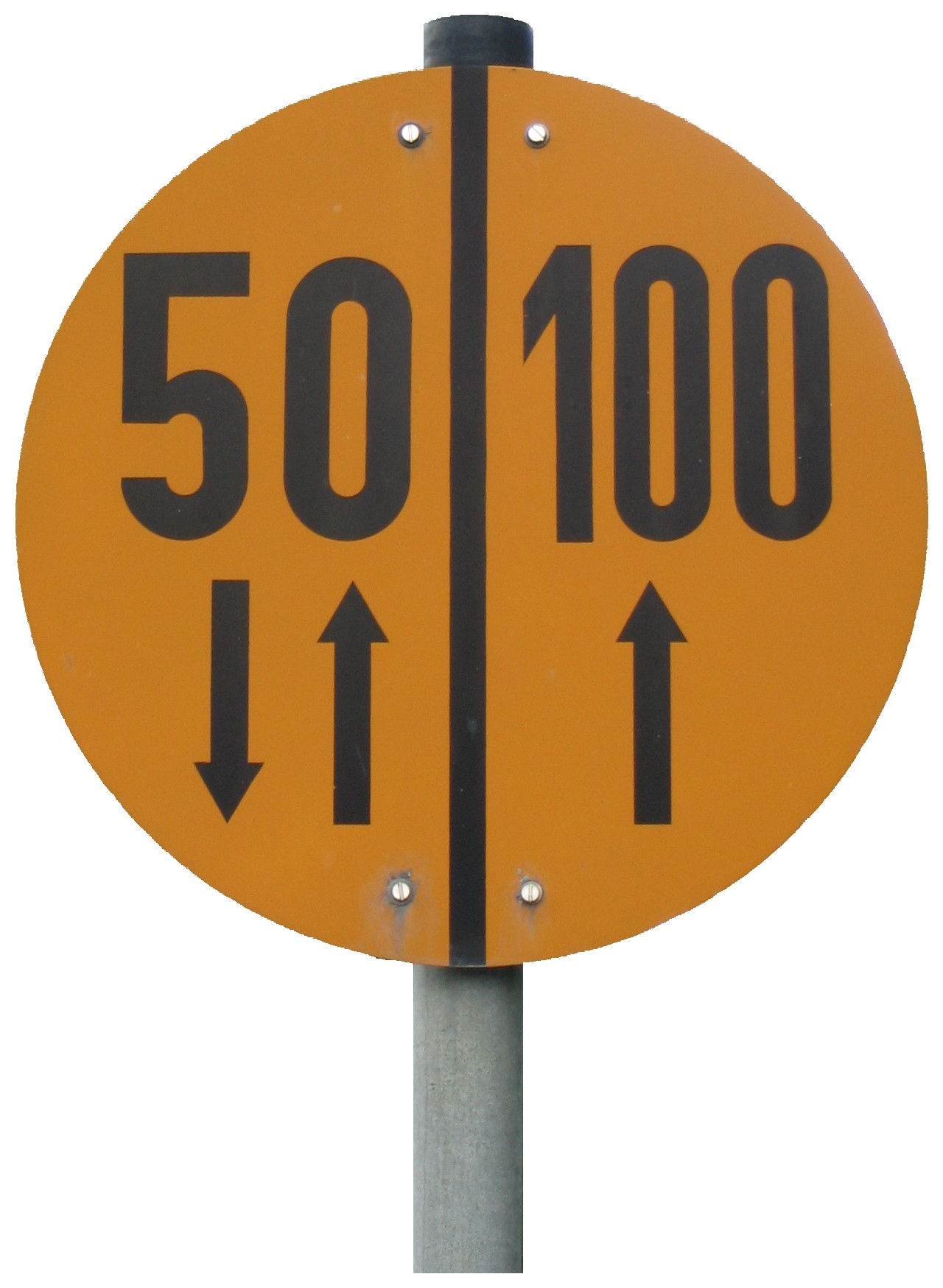
Road sign

The Military Load Classification (MLC) is a system of standards used by NATO to classify the safe amount of load a surface can withstand. Load-carrying capacity is shown in whole numbers for vehicles, bridges, roads, and routes. Vehicles are classified by weight, type, and effect on routes. Bridges, roads, and routes are classified by physical characteristics, type and flow of traffic, effects of weather, and other special conditions.

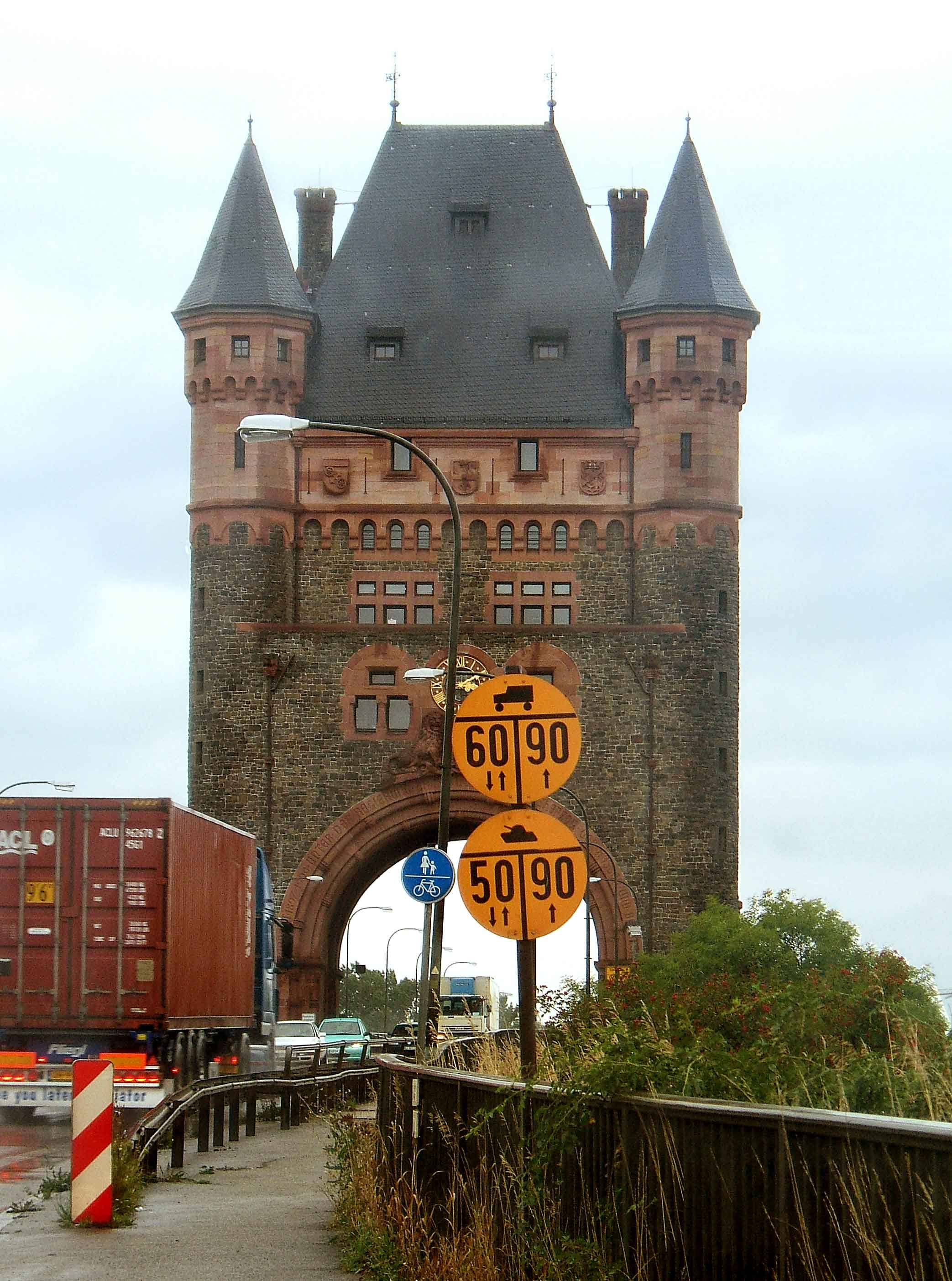
MLC signs at the Nibelung bridge, Worms, Germany

== How the system is applied ==
Usually, the lowest bridge classification number (regardless of vehicle type or conditions of traffic flow) sets the load classification of a route. If no bridge is located on the route, the worst section of road governs the route's classification. Vehicles having higher load classifications than a particular route are sometimes able to use that route if a recon overlay or a special recon shows that a change in traffic control, such as making a bridge a single-flow crossing, would permit use of the route by heavier traffic.

Whenever possible, the basic military road network is composed of average routes and includes a number of heavy traffic routes and a few very heavy traffic routes. The class of a military road maneuver network is fixed by the minimum route classification of the network. Individual routes are grouped and identified in broad categories.

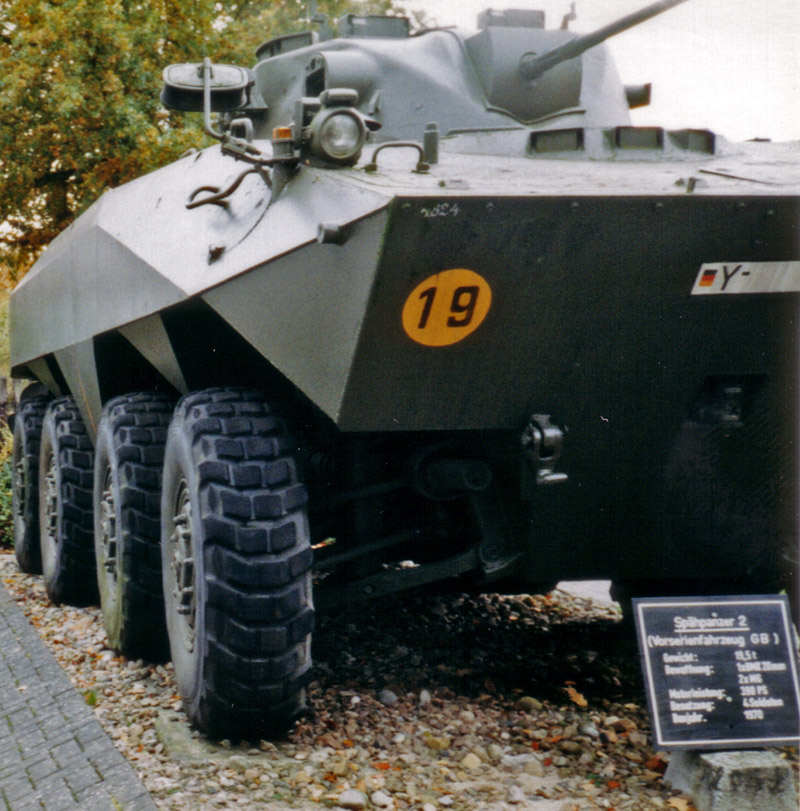
MLC painted on a Luchs armored reconnaissance vehicle

The MLC scale is defined in terms of a set of 16 hypothetical standard wheeled vehicles and a set of 16 hypothetical tracked vehicles. Originally, these hypothetical vehicles were typical of actual military vehicles used in NATO countries. Standard tracked vehicles are designated by MLC numbers ranging from 4 to 150, which correspond to the gross vehicle weight in short tons. Each standard tracked vehicle is also defined in terms of track width, length, and spacing. Standard wheeled vehicles are designated by the same MLC numbers (4 through 150), which correspond to about 85% of the gross weight in short tons. Each standard wheeled vehicle is defined in terms of gross weight, number of axles, axle spacing, and axle load.

== Maximum single-axle load ==
In addition to the standard hypothetical wheeled vehicles, a maximum single-axle load is specified for each MLC. This is used to represent the loading on very short spans, when only one axle is on the span at a time.
