= Zinc chromate =

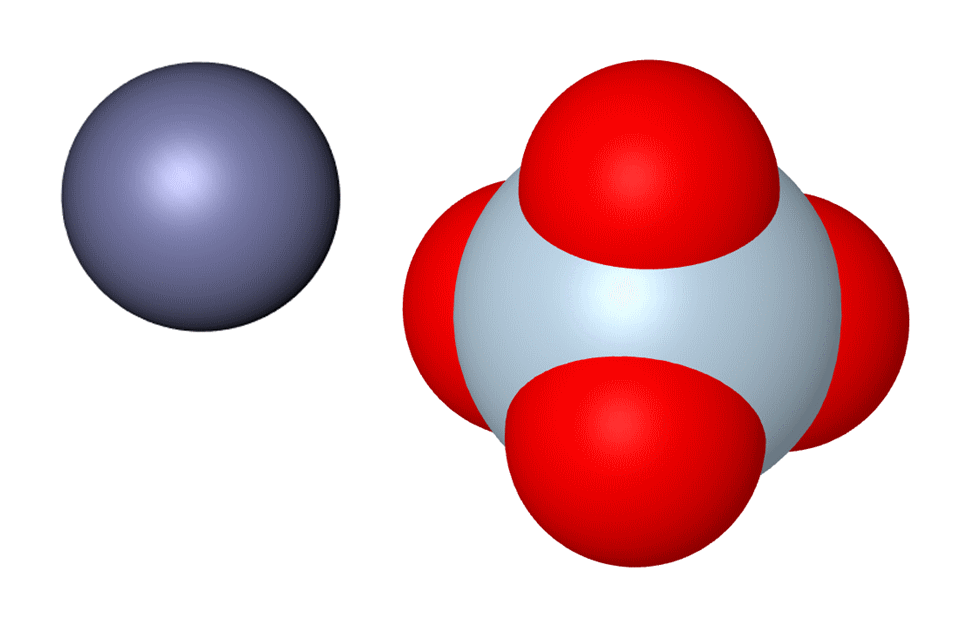

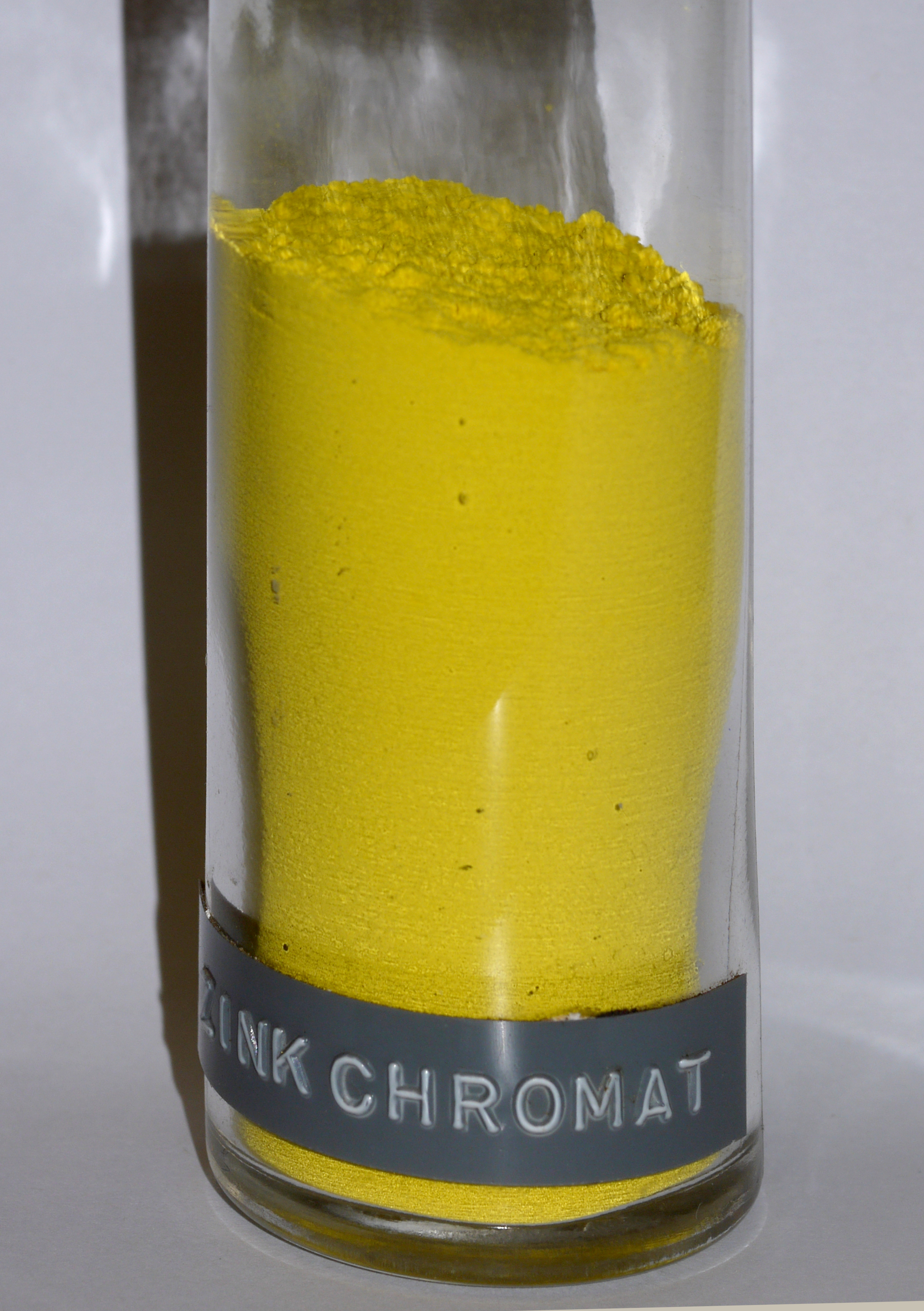
- Powdered zinc chromate

Names
- IUPAC name Zinc chromate

Identifiers
CAS Number	13530-65-9
3D model (JSmol)	Interactive image
ChemSpider	24301
ECHA InfoCard	100.033.511
EC Number	236-878-9
PubChem CID	26089
RTECS number	GB3290000
UNII	05F2837HUF
UN number	3288 3077
CompTox Dashboard (EPA)	DTXSID7047485
- InChI: InChI=1S/Cr.4O.Zn/q;;;2*-1;+2 Key: NDKWCCLKSWNDBG-UHFFFAOYSA-N
- SMILES: [O-][Cr](=O)(=O)[O-].[Zn+2]

Properties
Chemical formula	ZnCrO_{4}
Molar mass	181.403 g/mol
Appearance	yellow-green crystals; yellow powder
Density	3.43 g/cm^{3}
Melting point	316 °C (601 °F; 589 K)
Boiling point	732 °C (1,350 °F; 1,005 K)
Solubility in water	insoluble

Hazards
- GHS labelling
Pictograms	(GHS07: Exclamation mark) (GHS08: Health hazard) (GHS09: Environmental hazard)
Signal word	Danger
Hazard statements	H302, H317, H350, H410
Precautionary statements	P201, P202, P261, P264, P270, P272, P273, P280, P281, P301+P312, P302+P352, P308+P313, P330, P333+P313, P363, P391, P405, P501
NFPA 704 (fire diamond)	2 0 0 OX
- Lethal dose or concentration (LD, LC)
LD_{50} (median dose)	0.5 to 5 g/kg
- NIOSH (US health exposure limits)
PEL (Permissible)	0.1 mg/m^{3}

Related compounds
Other anions	Zinc dichromate
Other cations	Potassium chromate Sodium chromate
- Except where otherwise noted, data are given for materials in their standard state (at 25 °C [77 °F], 100 kPa). verify (what is ?) Infobox references

Zinc chromate, ZnCrO_{4}, is a chemical compound, a salt containing the chromate anion, appearing as odorless yellow powder or yellow-green crystals, but, when used for coatings, pigments are often added. It is used industrially in chromate conversion coatings, having been developed by the Ford Motor Company in the 1920s.

== Production ==
A process known as the Cronak process is used to create zinc chromate for use in industry. This process is done by putting zinc or a zinc plated metal in a solution of sodium dichromate and sulfuric acid for a few seconds. Zinc chromate can also be synthesized by using neutral potassium chromate (K_{2}CrO_{4}) and zinc sulfate (ZnSO_{4}), which forms a precipitate.

K_{2}CrO_{4} + ZnSO_{4} → ZnCrO_{4} + K_{2}SO_{4}

== Uses ==
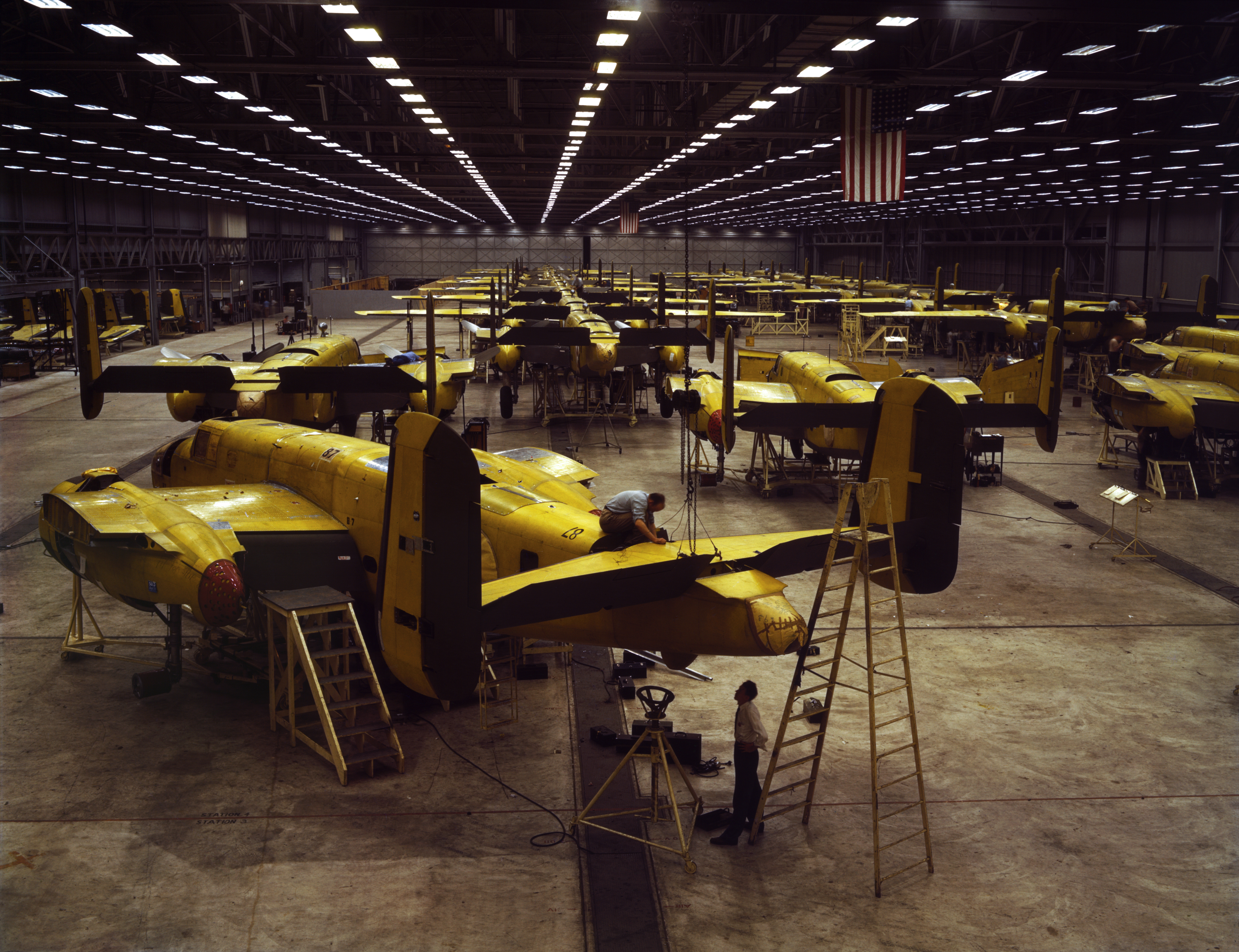
B-25 Mitchell bombers, painted with zinc chromate undercoat, under assembly, 1942

Zinc chromate's main use is in industrial painting as a coating over iron or aluminium materials. It was used extensively on aircraft by the US military, especially during the 1930s and 1940s. It is also used in a variety of paint coatings for the aerospace and automotive industries. Its use as a corrosion-resistant agent was applied to aluminium alloy parts first in commercial aircraft, and then in military ones. During the 1940 and 1950s it was typically found as the "paint" in the wheel wells of retractable landing gear on US military aircraft to protect the aluminium from corrosion. This compound was a useful coating because it is an anti-corrosive and anti-rust primer. Since it is highly toxic, it also destroys organic growth on the surface. Zinc chromate is also used in spray paints, artists' paints, pigments in varnishes, and in making linoleum.

When used as a pigment, it is known as Zinc Yellow, Buttercup Yellow or Yellow 36. It is rarely used in art because the pigment degenerates into a brown color. This effect can be seen in Georges Seurat's famous painting A Sunday Afternoon on the Island of La Grande Jatte. The degradation of zinc yellow in Seurat's painting was thoroughly investigated and these findings were subsequently employed in a digital rejuvenation of the painting.

Zinc chromate putty was used as sealant in addition to two O-rings between sections of the failed solid rocket booster on Space Shuttle Challenger. Blowholes in this putty may have been a minor contributor to its catastrophic loss.

== Toxicity ==
Recent studies have shown that not only is zinc chromate highly toxic, it is also a carcinogen because it contains hexavalent chromium. Exposure to zinc chromate can cause tissue ulceration and cancer. A study published in the British Journal of Industrial Medicine showed a significant correlation between the use of zinc chromate and lead chromate in factories and the number of cases in lung cancer experienced by the workers. Because of its toxicity the use of zinc chromate has greatly diminished in recent years.
