= Pot metal =

Alloy of various low-melting point, usually scrap, metals

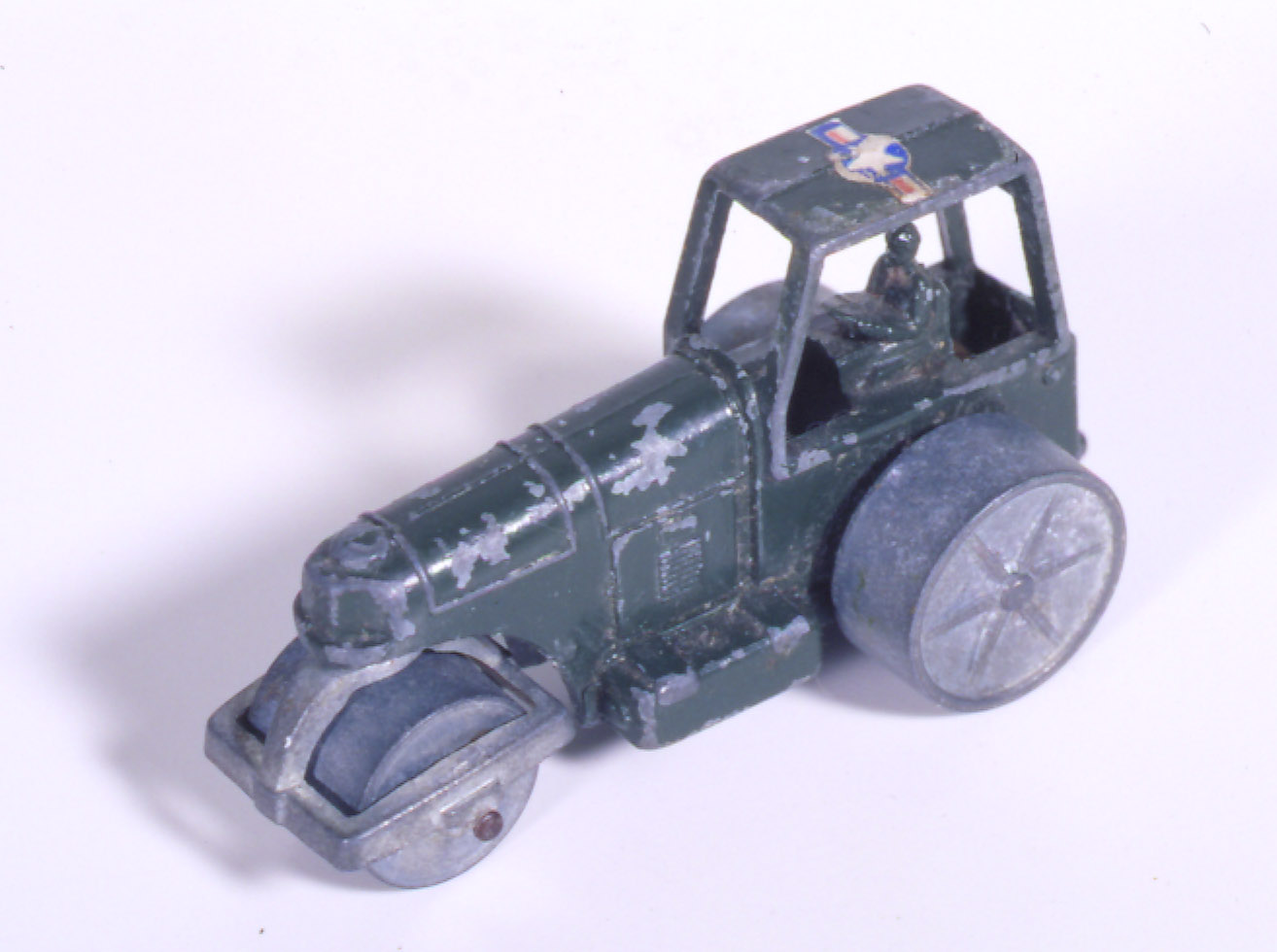
Toy road roller cast from zinc

Pot metal (or monkey metal) is an alloy of low-melting point metals that manufacturers use to make fast, inexpensive castings. The term "pot metal" came about because of automobile factories' practice in the early 20th century of gathering up non-ferrous metal scraps from the manufacturing processes and melting them in one pot to form into cast products. Small amounts of iron often made it into the castings but never in significant quantity because too much iron would raise the melting point too high for simple casting operations.

In stained glass, "pot metal" or pot metal glass refers to glass coloured with metal oxides while it is molten (in a pot), as opposed to other methods of colouring glass in sheet form.

== Metallurgy ==
There is no metallurgical standard for pot metal. Common metals in pot metal include zinc, lead, copper, tin, magnesium, aluminium, iron, and cadmium. The primary advantage of pot metal is that it is quick and easy to cast. Because of its low melting temperature, it requires no sophisticated foundry equipment or specialized molds. Manufacturers sometimes use it to experiment with molds and ideas (e.g., prototypes) before casting final products in a higher quality alloy.

Depending on the exact metals "thrown into the pot", pot metal can become unstable over time, as it has a tendency to bend, distort, crack, shatter, and pit with age. The low boiling point of zinc and fast cooling of newly cast parts often trap air bubbles within the cast part, weakening it. Many components common in pot metal are susceptible to corrosion from airborne acids and other contaminants, and internal corrosion of the metal often causes decorative plating to flake off. Pot metal is not easily glued, soldered, or welded.

In the late nineteenth century, pot metal referred specifically to a copper alloy that was primarily alloyed with lead. Mixtures of 67% copper with 29% lead and 4% antimony and another one of 80% copper with 20% lead were common formulations.

The primary component of pot metal is zinc, but often the caster adds other metals to the mix to strengthen the cast part, improve flow of the molten metal, or to reduce cost. With a low melting point of 420 °C (786 °F), zinc is often alloyed with other metals including lead, tin, aluminium, and copper.

== Uses ==
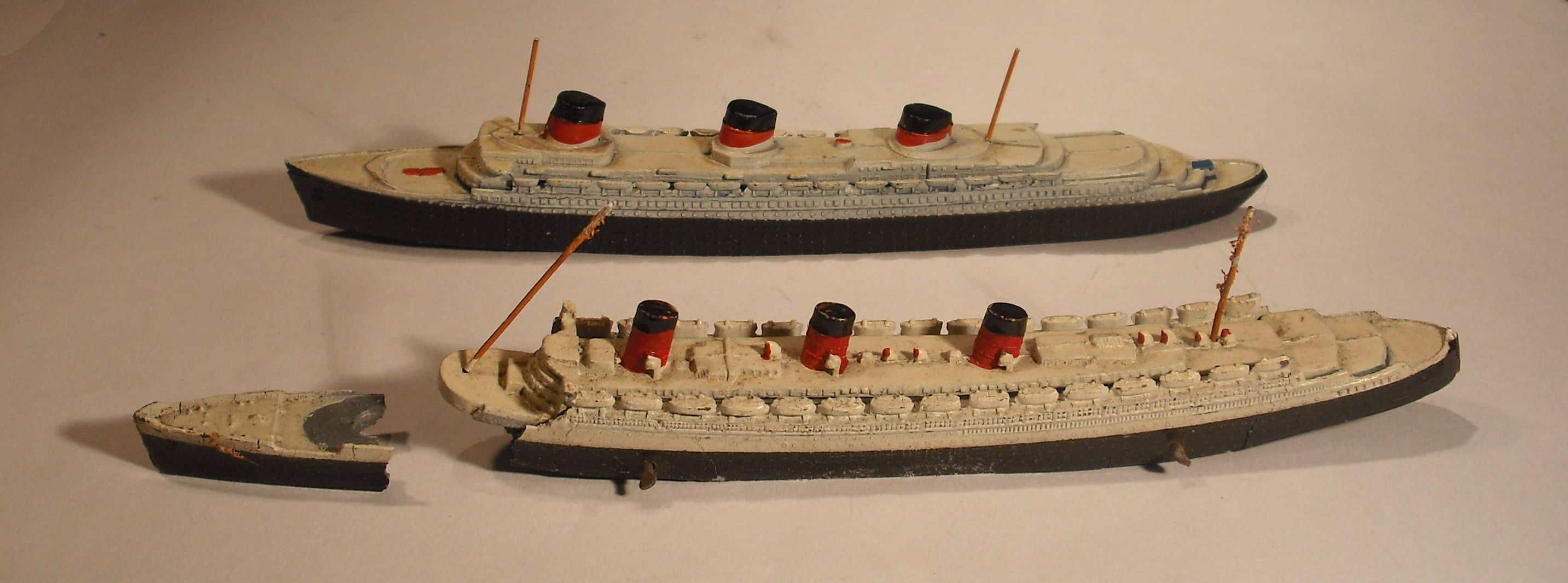
Models of RMS Queen Mary and SS Normandie. The Queen Mary model has cracked in the bow due to zinc pest.

Pot metal is generally used for parts that are not subject to high stresses or torque. Items created from pot metal include toys, furniture fittings, tool parts, electronics components, automotive parts, inexpensive jewelry and improvised weaponry.. Pot metal was commonly used to manufacture gramophone parts in the late 1920s and 1930s, with notable examples being the back covers on some His Master's Voice no.4 soundboxes and His Master's Voice no.5 soundboxes. It was also used to make loudspeaker transducers used with early radio horn speakers before cone speakers were developed. It is also used in inexpensive electric guitars and other budget-priced musical instruments.

== See also ==
- Babbitt (alloy)
- Pewter
- White metal
- Zamak
- Zinc aluminium
- Zinc pest
