= Zamak =

Metal alloy

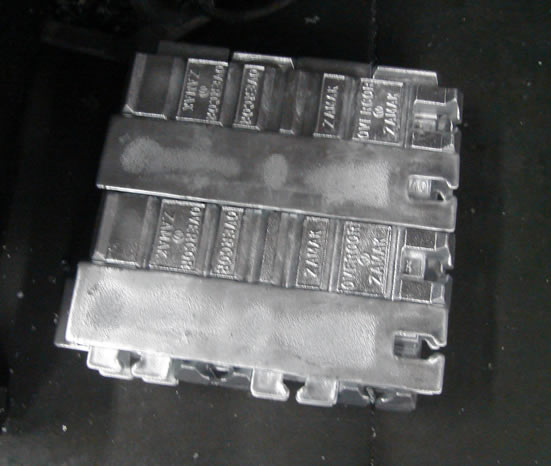
Zamak ingots

ZAMAK (or Zamac, formerly trademarked as MAZAK) is a family of alloys with a base metal of zinc and alloying elements of aluminum, magnesium, and copper.

Zamak alloys are part of the zinc aluminum alloy family; they are distinguished from the other ZA alloys because of their constant 4% aluminum composition.

The name zamak is an acronym of the German names for the metals of which the alloys are composed: Zink (zinc), Aluminium, Magnesium, and Kupfer (copper). The New Jersey Zinc Company developed zamak alloys in 1929.

The most common zamak alloy is zamak 3. Besides that, zamak 2, zamak 5, and zamak 7 are also commercially used. These alloys are most commonly die-cast. Zamak alloys (particularly #3 and #5) are frequently used in the spin-casting industry.

A large problem with early zinc-die-casting materials was zinc pest, owing to impurities in the alloys. Zamak avoided this by the use of 99.99% pure zinc metal, produced by New Jersey Zinc's use of a refluxer as part of the refining-process.

Zamak can be electroplated, wet-painted, and chromate-conversion-coated well.

== Mazak ==
In the early 1930s, Morris Ashby in Britain had licensed the New Jersey zamak alloy. The 99.99%-purity refluxer zinc was not available in Britain and so they acquired the right to manufacture the alloy using a locally-available electrolytically-refined zinc of 99.95% purity. This was given the name Mazak, partly to distinguish it from zamak and partly from the initials of Morris Ashby. In 1933, National Smelting licensed the refluxer patent with the intent of using it to produce 99.99% zinc in their plant at Avonmouth.

== Standards ==
Zinc alloy chemical composition standards are defined per country by the standard listed below:

Zinc alloy standards per country
Country	Zinc ingot	Zinc casting
Europe	EN1774	EN12844
US	ASTM B240	ASTM B86
Japan	JIS H2201	JIS H5301
Australia	AS 1881 - SAA H63	AS 1881 - SAA H64
China	GB 8738-88	-
Canada	CSA HZ3	CSA HZ11
International	ISO 301	-

Zamak goes by many different names based on standard and/or country:

Various names for zamak alloys
Traditional name	Short composition name	Form	Common	ASTM^{†}	Short European designation	JIS	China	UK BS 1004	France NFA 55-010	Germany DIN 1743-2	UNS	Other
Zamak 2 or Kirksite	ZnAl4Cu3	Ingot	Alloy 2	AC 43A	ZL0430	-	ZX04	-	Z-A4U3	Z430	Z35540	ZL2, ZA-2, ZN-002
Zamak 2 or Kirksite	ZnAl4Cu3	Cast	Alloy 2	AC 43A	ZP0430	-	-	-	Z-A4U3	Z430	Z35541	ZP2, ZA-2, ZN-002
Zamak 3	ZnAl4	Ingot	Alloy 3	AG 40A	ZL0400	Ingot type 2	ZX01	Alloy A	Z-A4	Z400	Z35521	ZL3, ZA-3, ZN-003
Zamak 3	ZnAl4	Cast	Alloy 3	AG 40A	ZP0400	ZDC2	-	Alloy A	Z-A4	Z400	Z33520	ZP3, ZA-3, ZN-003
Zamak 4		Ingot	Used in Asia only									ZA-4, ZN-004
Zamak 5	ZnAl4Cu1	Ingot	Alloy 5	AC 41A	ZL0410	Ingot type 1	ZX03	Alloy B	Z-A4UI	Z410	Z35530	ZL5, ZA-5, ZN-005
Zamak 5	ZnAl4Cu1	Cast	Alloy 5	AC 41A	ZP0410	ZDC1	-	Alloy B	Z-A4UI	Z410	Z35531	ZP5, ZA-5, ZN-005
Zamak 7	ZnAl4Ni	Ingot	Alloy 7	AG 40B	-	-	ZX02	-	-	-	Z33522	ZA-7, ZN-007
Zamak 7	ZnAl4Ni	Cast	Alloy 7	AG 40B	-	-	-	-	-	-	Z33523	ZA-7, ZN-007
^{†}color of the cell is the color of the material designated by ASTM B908.

The short European designation code breaks down as follows (using ZL0430 as the example):

- Z is the material (Z=-zinc)
- P is the use (P=pressure-die-casting (casting), L=ingot)
- 04 is the percent aluminum (04=4% aluminum)
- 3 is the percent copper (3=3% copper)

== Zamak 2 ==
Zamak 2 has the same composition as zamak 3 with the addition of 3% copper in order to increase strength by 20%, which also increases the price. Zamak 2 has the greatest strength out of all the zamak alloys. Over time it retains its strength and hardness better than the other alloys; however, it becomes more brittle, shrinks, and is less elastic.

Zamak 2 is also known as Kirksite when gravity-cast for use as a die. It was originally designed for low volume sheet-metal-dies. It later gained popularity for making short-run injection-molding-dies. It is also less-commonly used for non-sparking tools and mandrels for metal-spinning.

Zamak 2 composition per standard
		Alloying elements			Impurities							
Standard	Limit	Al	Cu	Mg	Pb	Cd	Sn	Fe	Ni	Si	In	Tl
ASTM B240 (Ingot)	min	3.9	2.6	0.025	-	-	-	-	-	-	-	-
ASTM B240 (Ingot)	max	4.3	2.9	0.05	0.004	0.003	0.002	0.075	-	-	-	-
ASTM B86 (Cast)	min	3.5	2.6	0.025	-	-	-	-	-	-	-	-
ASTM B86 (Cast)	max	4.3	2.9	0.05	0.005	0.004	0.003	0.1	-	-	-	-
EN1774 (Ingot)	min	3.8	2.7	0.035	-	-	-	-	-	-	-	-
EN1774 (Ingot)	max	4.2	3.3	0.06	0.003	0.003	0.001	0.02	0.001	0.02	-	-
EN12844 (Cast)	min	3.7	2.7	0.025	-	-	-	-	-	-	-	-
EN12844 (Cast)	max	4.3	3.3	0.06	0.005	0.005	0.002	0.05	0.02	0.03	-	-
GB8738-88	min	3.9	2.6	0.03	-	-	-	-	-	-	-	-
GB8738-88	max	4.3	3.1	0.06	0.004	0.003	0.0015	0.035	-	-	-	-

Zamak 2 properties
Property	Metric value	Imperial value
Mechanical properties
Ultimate tensile strength	397 MPa (331 MPa aged)	58,000 psi
Yield strength (0.2% offset)	361 MPa	52,000 psi
Impact strength	38 J (7 J aged)	28 ft-lbf (5 ft-lbf aged)
Elongation at F_{max}	3% (2% aged)	
Elongation at fracture	6%	
Shear strength	317 MPa	46,000 psi
Compressive yield strength	641 MPa	93,000 psi
Fatigue strength (reverse bending 5 × 10^{8} cycles)	59 MPa	8,600 psi
Hardness	130 Brinell (98 Brinell aged)	
Modulus of elasticity	96 GPa	14,000,000 psi
Physical properties
Solidification range (melting range)	379–390 °C	714–734 °F
Density	6.8 kg/dm^{3}	0.25 lb/in^{3}
Coefficient of thermal expansion	27.8 μm/m-°C	15.4 μin/in-°F
Thermal conductivity	105 W/m-K	729 BTU-in/hr-ft^{2}-°F
Electrical resistivity	6.85 μΩ-cm at 20°C	2.70 μΩ-in at 68 °F
Latent heat (heat of fusion)	110 J/g	4.7 × 10^{−5} BTU/lb
Specific heat capacity	419 J/kg-°C	0.100 BTU/lb-°F
Coefficient of friction	0.08	

=== KS ===
The KS alloy was developed for spin casting decorative parts. It has the same composition as zamak 2, except with more magnesium in order to produce finer grains and reduce the orange peel effect.

KS composition
		Alloying elements			Impurities							
Standard	Limit	Al	Cu	Mg	Pb	Cd	Sn	Fe	Ni	Si	In	Tl
Nyrstar	min	3.8	2.5	0.4	-	-	-	-	-	-	-	-
Nyrstar	max	4.2	3.5	0.6	0.003	0.003	0.001	0.020	-	-	-	-

KS properties
Property	Metric value	Imperial value
Mechanical properties
Ultimate tensile strength	< 200MPa	< 29,000psi
Yield strength (0.2% offset)	< 200MPa	< 29,000psi
Elongation	< 2%	
Hardness	150 Brinell max	
Physical properties
Solidification range (melting range)	380-390°C	716-734°F
Density	6.6g/cm^{3}	0.25lb/in^{3}
Coefficient of thermal expansion	28.0μm/m-°C	15.4μin/in-°F
Thermal conductivity	105W/m-K	729BTU-in/hr-ft^{2}-°F
Electrical conductivity	25% IACS	
Specific heat capacity	419J/kg-°C	0.100BTU/lb-°F
Coefficient of friction	0.08	

== Zamak 3 ==
Zamak 3 is the de facto standard for the zamak series of zinc alloys; all other zinc alloys are compared to this. Zamak 3 has the base composition for the zamak alloys (96% zinc, 4% aluminum). It has excellent castability and long term dimensional stability. More than 70% of all North American zinc die castings are made from zamak 3.

Zamak 3 composition per standard
		Alloying elements			Impurities							
Standard	Limit	Al	Cu^{†}	Mg	Pb	Cd	Sn	Fe	Ni	Si	In	Tl
ASTM B240 (Ingot)	min	3.9	-	0.025	-	-	-	-	-	-	-	-
ASTM B240 (Ingot)	max	4.3	0.1	0.05	0.004	0.003	0.002	0.035	-	-	-	-
ASTM B86 (Cast)	min	3.5	-	0.025	-	-	-	-	-	-	-	-
ASTM B86 (Cast)	max	4.3	0.25	0.05	0.005	0.004	0.003	0.1	-	-	-	-
EN1774 (Ingot)	min	3.8	-	0.035	-	-	-	-	-	-	-	-
EN1774 (Ingot)	max	4.2	0.03	0.06	0.003	0.003	0.001	0.02	0.001	0.02	-	-
EN12844 (Cast)	min	3.7	-	0.025	-	-	-	-	-	-	-	-
EN12844 (Cast)	max	4.3	0.1	0.06	0.005	0.005	0.002	0.05	0.02	0.03	-	-
JIS H2201 (Ingot)	min	3.9	-	0.03	-	-	-	-	-	-	-	-
JIS H2201 (Ingot)	max	4.3	0.03	0.06	0.003	0.002	0.001	0.075	-	-	-	-
JIS H5301 (Cast)	min	3.5	-	0.02	-	-	-	-	-	-	-	-
JIS H5301 (Cast)	max	4.3	0.25	0.06	0.005	0.004	0.003	0.01	-	-	-	-
AS1881	min	3.9	-	0.04	-	-	-	-	-	-	-	-
AS1881	max	4.3	0.03	0.06	0.003	0.003	0.001	0.05	-	0.001	0.0005	0.001
GB8738-88	min	3.9	-	0.03	-	-	-	-	-	-	-	-
GB8738-88	max	4.3	0.1	0.06	0.004	0.003	0.0015	0.035	-	-	-	-
^{†}Impurity

Zamak 3 properties
Property	Metric value	Imperial value
Mechanical properties
Ultimate tensile strength	268 MPa	38,900 psi
Yield strength (0.2% offset)	208 MPa	30,200 psi
Impact strength	46 J (56 J aged)	34 ft-lbf (41 ft-lbf aged)
Elongation at F_{max}	3%	
Elongation at fracture	6.3% (16% aged)	
Shear strength	214 MPa	31,000 psi
Compressive yield strength	414 MPa	60,000 psi
Fatigue strength (reverse bending 5 × 10^{8} cycles)	48 MPa	7,000 psi
Hardness	97 Brinell	
Modulus of elasticity	96 GPa	14,000,000 psi
Physical properties
Solidification range (melting range)	381-387°C	718-729°F
Density	6.7g/cm^{3}	0.24lb/in^{3}
Coefficient of thermal expansion	27.4μm/m-°C	15.2μin/in-°F
Thermal conductivity	113W/mK	784BTU-in/hr-ft^{2}-°F
Electrical resistivity	6.37μΩ-cm at 20°C	2.51μΩ-in at 68°F
Latent heat (heat of fusion)	110J/g	4.7 × 10^{−5} BTU/lb
Specific heat capacity	419J/kg-°C	0.100BTU/lb-°F
Coefficient of friction	0.07	

== Zamak 4 ==
Zamak 4 was developed for the Asian markets to reduce the effects of die-soldering while maintaining the ductility of zamak 3. This was achieved by using half the amount of copper from the zamak 5 composition.

Zamak 4 composition per standard
		Alloying elements			Impurities							
Standard	Limit	Al	Cu	Mg	Pb	Cd	Sn	Fe	Ni	Si	In	Tl
Ningbo Jinyi Alloy Material Co.	min	3.9	0.3	0.03	-	-	-	-	-	-	-	-
Ningbo Jinyi Alloy Material Co.	max	4.3	0.5	0.06	0.003	0.002	0.002	0.075	-	-	-	-

Zamak 4 properties
Property	Metric value	Imperial value
Mechanical properties
Ultimate tensile strength	317 MPa	46,000 psi
Yield strength (0.2% offset)	221-269 MPa	32,000-39,000 psi
Impact strength	61 J (7 J aged)	45ft-lbf (5ft-lbf aged)
Elongation	7%	
Shear strength	214-262 MPa	31,000-38,000 psi
Compressive yield strength	414-600 MPa	60,000-87,000 psi
Fatigue strength (rotary bending 5 × 10^{8} cycles)	48-57 MPa	7,000-8,300 psi
Hardness	91 Brinell	
Physical properties
Solidification range (melting range)	380-386°C	716-727°F
Density	6.6g/cm^{3}	0.24lb/in^{3}
Coefficient of thermal expansion	27.4 μm/m-°C	15.2 μin/in-°F
Thermal conductivity	108.9-113.0W/m-K @ 100 °C	755.6-784.0 BTU-in/hr-ft^{2}-°F @ 212°F
Electrical conductivity	26-27% IACS	
Specific heat capacity	418.7 J/kg-°C	0.100 BTU/lb-°F

== Zamak 5 ==
Zamak 5 has the same composition as zamak 3 with the addition of 1% copper in order to increase strength (by approximately 10%), hardness and corrosive resistance, but reduces ductility. It also has less dimensional accuracy. Zamak 5 is more commonly used in Europe.

Zamak 5 composition per standard
		Alloying elements			Impurities								
Standard	Limit	Al	Cu	Mg	Pb	Cd	Sn	Fe	Ni	Si	In	Tl	Zn
ASTM B240 (Ingot)	min	3.9	0.75	0.03	-	-	-	-	-	-	-	-	
ASTM B240 (Ingot)	max	4.3	1.25	0.06	0.004	0.003	0.002	0.075	-	-	-	-	
ASTM B86 (Cast)	min	3.5	0.75	0.03	-	-	-	-	-	-	-	-	
ASTM B86 (Cast)	max	4.3	1.25	0.06	0.005	0.004	0.003	0.1	-	-	-	-	
EN1774 (Ingot)	min	3.8	0.7	0.035	-	-	-	-	-	-	-	-	
EN1774 (Ingot)	max	4.2	1.1	0.06	0.003	0.003	0.001	0.02	0.001	0.02	-	-	
EN12844 (Cast)	min	3.7	0.7	0.025	-	-	-	-	-	-	-	-	
EN12844 (Cast)	max	4.3	1.2	0.06	0.005	0.005	0.002	0.05	0.02	0.03	-	-	
JIS H2201 (Ingot)	min	3.9	0.75	0.03	-	-	-	-	-	-	-	-	
JIS H2201 (Ingot)	max	4.3	1.25	0.06	0.003	0.002	0.001	0.075	-	-	-	-	
JIS H5301 (Cast)	min	3.5	0.75	0.02	-	-	-	-	-	-	-	-	
JIS H5301 (Cast)	max	4.3	1.25	0.06	0.005	0.004	0.003	0.01	-	-	-	-	
AS1881	min	3.9	0.75	0.04	-	-	-	-	-	-	-	-	
AS1881	max	4.3	1.25	0.06	0.003	0.003	0.001	0.05	-	0.001	0.0005	0.001	
GB8738-88	min	3.9	0.7	0.03	-	-	-	-	-	-	-	-	
GB8738-88	max	4.3	1.1	0.06	0.004	0.003	0.0015	0.035	-	-	-	-	

Zamak 5 properties
Property	Metric value	Imperial value
Mechanical properties
Ultimate tensile strength	331 MPa (270 MPa aged)	48,000 psi (39,000 psi aged)
Yield strength (0.2% offset)	295 MPa	43,000 psi
Impact strength	52 J (56 J aged)	38 ft-lbf (41 ft-lbf aged)
Elongation at F_{max}	2%	
Elongation at fracture	3.6% (13% aged)	
Shear strength	262 MPa	38,000 psi
Compressive yield strength	600 MPa	87,000 psi
Fatigue strength (reverse bending 5 × 10^{8} cycles)	57 MPa	8,300 psi
Hardness	91 Brinell	
Modulus of elasticity	96 GPa	14,000,000 psi
Physical properties
Solidification range (melting range)	380—386 °C	716—727 °F
Density	6.6 g/cm^{3}	0.24 lb/in^{3}
Coefficient of thermal expansion	27.4 μm/m-°C	15.2 μin/in-°F
Thermal conductivity	109 W/mK	756 BTU-in/hr-ft^{2}-°F
Electrical resistivity	6.54 μΩ-cm at 20 °C	2.57 μΩ-in at 68 °F
Latent heat (heat of fusion)	110 J/g	4.7 × 10^{−5} BTU/lb
Specific heat capacity	419 J/kg-°C	0.100 BTU/lb-°F
Coefficient of friction	0.08	

== Zamak 7 ==
Zamak 7 has less magnesium than zamak 3 to increase fluidity and ductility, which is especially useful when casting thin wall components. In order to reduce inter-granular corrosion a small amount of nickel is added and impurities are more strictly controlled.

Zamak 7 composition per standard
		Alloying elements			Impurities							
Standard	Limit	Al	Cu^{†}	Mg	Pb	Cd	Sn	Fe	Ni^{‡}	Si	In	Tl
ASTM B240 (Ingot)	min	3.9	-	0.01	-	-	-	-	-	-	-	-
ASTM B240 (Ingot)	max	4.3	0.1	0.02	0.002	0.002	0.001	0.075	-	-	-	-
ASTM B86 (Cast)	min	3.5	-	0.005	-	-	-	-	0.005	-	-	-
ASTM B86 (Cast)	max	4.3	0.25	0.02	0.003	0.002	0.001	0.075	0.02	-	-	-
GB8738-88	min	3.9	-	0.01	-	-	-	-	0.005	-	-	-
GB8738-88	max	4.3	0.1	0.02	0.002	0.002	0.001	0.075	0.02	-	-	-
^{†}Impurity ^{‡}Alloying element

Zamak 7 properties
Property	Metric value	Imperial value
Mechanical properties
Ultimate tensile strength	285 MPa	41,300 psi
Yield strength (0.2% offset)	285 MPa	41,300 psi
Impact strength	58.0 J	42.8 ft-lbf
Elongation at fracture	14%	
Shear strength	214 MPa	31,000 psi
Compressive yield strength	414 MPa	60,000 psi
Fatigue strength (reverse bending 5 × 10^{8} cycles)	47.0 MPa	6,820 psi
Hardness	80 Brinell	
Physical properties
Solidification range (melting range)	381—387 °C	718—729 °F
Coefficient of thermal expansion	27.4 μm/m-°C	15.2 μin/in-°F
Thermal conductivity	113 W/m-K	784 BTU-in/hr-ft^{2}-°F
Electrical resistivity	6.4 μΩ-cm	2.5 μΩ-in
Specific heat capacity	419 J/kg-°C	0.100 BTU/lb-°F
Casting temperature	395—425 °C	743—797 °F

== Uses ==
Common uses for zamak alloys include appliances, bathroom fixtures, die cast toys and automotive industry. Zamak alloys are also used in the manufacture of some firearms such as those from Hi-Point Firearms. In World War 2, zamak alloy buttplates were one of three variations common on Canadian and American-made .303 Lee Enfield rifles, particularly during mid-war production.

== See also ==
- Pot metal
- Babbitt (alloy)
