= Zinc refining =

Process of purifying zinc

Zinc refining is the process of purifying zinc to special high grade (SHG) zinc, which is at least 99.995% pure. This process is not usually required when smelting of zinc is done through electrolysis processes, but is needed when zinc is produced by pyrometallurgical processes, because it is only 98.5% pure.

There are various refining methods, but the refluxing process is the most commonly used.

High purity zinc is required industrially to avoid zinc pest, a slow distortion and cracking of zinc die castings caused by impurities precipitating out.

== Refluxing process ==
The New Jersey Zinc Company invented this process in 1930.

The process take advantage of the relatively low boiling point of zinc (907 °C (1,665 °F)) as compared to the impurities being removed in the first "column": iron and aluminium. Therefore, in the first column the zinc is heated above its boiling point and allowed to rise to a condenser. The iron and aluminium impurities sink to the bottom in the form of a solid or liquid. There are still lead and cadmium vapor impurities. In order to remove the lead 2-3% of the vapor is condensed, which draws the majority of the lead out of the vapor; down to the point where it is only 0.003% of the total contents. Finally the vapor is pumped into the cadmium column where it is cooled to an intermediate temperature below the boiling point zinc, but still above the boiling point of cadmium (767 °C (1,413 °F)). The zinc leaves out the bottom as a refined liquid, while the cadmium leaves out the top as vapor.

== See also ==
- Zinc smelting
- ZAMAK

== Sources ==
- Porter, Frank (1991), Zinc Handbook: Properties, Processing, and Use in Design, CRC Press, pp. 21–22, ISBN 0-8247-8340-9.
