= Parkerization =

Parkerization can refer to:

- Parkerization (metallurgy), a method of protecting a steel surface from corrosion and increasing its resistance to wear
- Parkerization (oenology), the widespread stylization of wines to please the taste of wine critic Robert Parker
