= Conversion coating =

Type of metal coating

A conversion coating is a chemical or electro-chemical treatment applied to manufactured parts that superficially converts the material into a thin adhering coating of an insoluble compound. These coatings are commonly applied to protect the part against corrosion, to improve the adherence of other coatings, for lubrication, or for aesthetic purposes.

== Types ==
The most common conversion coating processes for metal parts with industrial use include

- Chromate (aluminum, steel)
- Phosphate (steel)
- Bluing (steel)
- Black oxide (steel)
- Anodizing (aluminum)
- Stannate (magnesium)
- Molybdate (zinc, zinc-nickel)
- Zirconate (steel, aluminum, magnesium, galvanized steel).
- Titanate (steel, aluminum, magnesium).
- Plasma electrolysis (aluminum, magnesium, titanium)

== Non-metallic substrates ==
Conversion coatings have been studied for non-metallic substrates, such as for protection of fluorozirconate glasses used in optoelectronics.

== Regulations ==
US military specifications for conversion coatings include MIL-DTL-5541, MIL-DTL-81706, and MIL-DTL-5574, all dealing with aluminum.

== See also ==
- Rust converter – tannate conversion coating
