= Jenolite =

Jenolite is a brand and British company based in Bedfordshire, England that develops and sells rust treatment products.

== History and operations ==
Jenolite, founded in 1939 by John H. Lawrence, initially specialized in rust inhibitors and converters before expanding to include primers and other metal treatment products. During and after World War II, it supplied anti-corrosion products for reconditioning military vehicles, supporting both the Ministry of Supply and Ministry of Defence. By the 1950s, Jenolite had expanded abroad with manufacturing sites in the US, Australia, and Belgium, where it contributed to NATO’s equipment reconditioning efforts. In the 1960s, Jenolite was integrated into Duckham Oils Ltd., and its products became widely used for industrial corrosion protection and restoration projects, such as the SS Great Britain.

Ownership changes occurred regularly from the 1980's leading to acquisitions by Permalite, Armour Trust, Bluecol Brands, Pennzoil Quaker State, and by 2005, the brand was under Shell Chemicals with limited attention. A new Jenolite company was established in 2013, under the ownership of the Wildon family, revitalizing the brand with an e-commerce business model and expanded operations in the UK, focusing on products for industrial, automotive, and restoration applications.

Product Range

Jenolite continues to be best known for its market leading treatments for metal surfaces and especially for treating rust. Its core rust treatment product range of rust removers, rust stain removers, rust converters, direct to rust paints and metal polishes are consistently ranked as the best for both domestic and industrial use. Rust Converters consistently rank as the number one for publications like Auto Express
