= Zinc smelting =

Conversion of zinc ore into pure zinc

Zinc smelting is the process of converting zinc concentrates (ores that contain zinc) into pure zinc. Zinc smelting has historically been more difficult than the smelting of other metals, e.g. iron, because in contrast, zinc has a low boiling point. At temperatures typically used for smelting metals, zinc is a gas that will escape from a furnace with the flue gas and be lost, unless specific measures are taken to prevent it.

The most common zinc concentrate processed is zinc sulfide, which is obtained by concentrating sphalerite via froth flotation. Secondary (recycled) zinc material, such as zinc oxide, is also processed with the zinc sulfide. Approximately 30% of all zinc produced is from recycled sources.

== Methods ==
There are two methods of smelting zinc: the pyrometallurgical process and the electrolysis process. Both methods are still used. Both of these processes share the same first step: roasting.

The top path is the pyrometallurgical process of smelting zinc and the bottom path is the electrolytic process.

=== Roasting ===
Roasting is a process of oxidizing zinc sulfide concentrates at high temperatures into an impure zinc oxide, called "Zinc Calcine". The chemical reactions that take place are as follows:

$$\ce{2ZnS + 3O2 -> 2ZnO + 2SO2}$$

$$\ce{2SO2 + O2 -> 2SO3}$$

Approximately 90% of zinc in concentrates are oxidized to zinc oxide. However, at the roasting temperatures around 10% of the zinc reacts with the iron impurities of the zinc sulfide concentrates to form zinc ferrite. A byproduct of roasting is sulfur dioxide, which is further processed into sulfuric acid, a commodity. The linked refinery flow sheet shows a schematic of Noranda's eastern Canadian zinc roasting operation

The process of roasting varies based on the type of roaster used. There are three types of roasters: multiple-hearth, suspension, and fluidized-bed.

==== Multiple-hearth roaster ====
In a multiple-hearth roaster, the concentrate drops through a series of 9 or more hearths stacked inside a brick-lined cylindrical column. As the feed concentrate drops through the furnace, it is first dried by the hot gases passing through the hearths and then oxidized to produce calcine. The reactions are slow and can be sustained only by the addition of fuel. Multiple hearth roasters are unpressurized and operate at about 690 °C (1,270 °F). Operating time depends upon the composition of concentrate and the amount of the sulfur removal required. Multiple hearth roasters have the capability of producing a high-purity calcine.

==== Suspension roaster ====
In a suspension roaster, the concentrates are blown into a combustion chamber very similar to that of a pulverized coal furnace. The roaster consists of a refractory-lined cylindrical steel shell, with a large combustion space at the top and 2 to 4 hearths in the lower portion, similar to those of a multiple hearth furnace. Additional grinding, beyond that required for a multiple hearth furnace, is normally required to ensure that heat transfer to the material is sufficiently rapid for the desulfurization and oxidation reactions to occur in the furnace chamber. Suspension roasters are unpressurized and operate at about 980 °C (1,800 °F).

==== Fluidized-bed roaster ====
In a fluidized-bed roaster, finely ground sulfide concentrates are suspended and oxidized in feedstock bed supported on an air column. As in the suspension roaster, the reaction rates for desulfurization are more rapid than in the older multiple-hearth processes. Fluidized-bed roasters operate under a pressure slightly lower than atmospheric and at temperatures averaging 1,000 °C (1,830 °F). In the fluidized-bed process, no additional fuel is required after ignition has been achieved. The major advantages of this roaster are greater throughput capacities, greater sulfur removal capabilities, and lower maintenance.

== Roast-Leach-Electrowin (RLE) process ==
Also known as the hydrometallurgical process, electrolysis process, or electrolytic process, RLE is more widely used than the pyrometallurgical processes.

The electrolysis process consists of 4 steps: leaching, purification, electrolysis, and melting and casting.

=== Leaching ===
The basic leaching chemical formula that drives this process is:

$$\ce{ZnO + SO3 -> ZnSO4}$$

This is achieved in practice through a process called double leaching. The calcine is first leached in a neutral or slightly acidic solution (of sulfuric acid) in order to leach the zinc out of the zinc oxide. The remaining calcine is then leached in strong sulfuric acid to leach the rest of the zinc out of the zinc oxide and zinc ferrite. The result of this process is a solid and a liquid; the liquid contains the zinc and is often called leach product; the solid is called leach residue and contains precious metals (usually lead and silver) which are sold as a by-product. There is also iron in the leach product from the strong acid leach, which is removed in an intermediate step, in the form of goethite, jarosite, and haematite. There is still cadmium, copper, arsenic, antimony, cobalt, germanium, nickel, and thallium in the leach product. Therefore, it needs to be purified.

=== Purification ===
The purification process utilizes the cementation process to further purify the zinc. It uses zinc dust and steam to remove copper, cadmium, cobalt, and nickel, which would interfere with the electrolysis process. After purification, concentrations of these impurities are limited to less than 0.05 milligram per liter (4×10^{−7} pound per U.S. gallon). Purification is usually conducted in large agitated tanks. The process takes place at temperatures ranging from 40 to 85 °C (104 to 185 °F), and pressures ranging from atmospheric to 2.4 atm (240 kPa) (absolute scale). The by-products are sold for further refining.

The zinc sulfate solution must be very pure for electrowinning to be at all efficient. Impurities can change the decomposition voltage enough to where the electrolysis cell produces largely hydrogen gas rather than zinc metal.

=== Electrolysis ===
Zinc is extracted from the purified zinc sulfate solution by electrowinning, which is a specialized form of electrolysis. The process works by passing an electric current through the solution in a series of cells. This causes the zinc to deposit on the cathodes (aluminium sheets) and oxygen to form at the anodes. Sulfuric acid is also formed in the process and reused in the leaching process. Every 24 to 48 hours, each cell is shut down, the zinc-coated cathodes are removed and rinsed, and the zinc is mechanically stripped from the aluminium plates.

Electrolytic zinc smelters contain as many as several hundred cells. A portion of the electrical energy is converted into heat, which increases the temperature of the electrolyte. Electrolytic cells operate at temperature ranges from 30 to 35 °C (86 to 95 °F) and at atmospheric pressure. A portion of the electrolyte is continuously circulated through the cooling towers both to cool and concentrate the electrolyte through evaporation of water. The cooled and concentrated electrolyte is then recycled to the cells. This process accounts for approximately one-third of all the energy usage when smelting zinc.

There are two common processes for electrowinning the metal: the low current density process, and the Tainton high current density process. The former uses a 10% sulfuric acid solution as the electrolyte, with current density of 270–325 amperes per square meter. The latter uses 22–28% sulfuric acid solution as the electrolyte with a current density of about 1,000 amperes per square metre. The latter gives better purity and has higher production capacity per volume of electrolyte, but has the disadvantage of running hotter and being more corrosive to the vessel in which it is done. In either of the electrolytic processes, each metric ton of zinc production expends about 3,900 kW⋅h (14 GJ) of electric power.

=== Melting and casting ===
Depending on the type of end-products produced, the zinc cathodes coming out of the electro-winning plant can undergo an additional transformation step in a foundry. Zinc cathodes are melted in induction furnaces and cast into marketable products such as ingots. Other metals and alloy components may be added to produce zinc containing alloys used in die-casting or general galvanization applications. Finally, molten zinc may be transported to nearby conversion plants or third parties using specially designed insulated containers.

== Pyrometallurgical processes ==
There are also several pyrometallurgical processes that reduce zinc oxide using carbon, then distil the metallic zinc from the resulting mix in an atmosphere of carbon monoxide. The major downfall of any of the pyrometallurgical process is that it is only 98% pure; a standard composition is 1.3% lead, 0.2% cadmium, 0.03% iron, and 98.5% zinc. This may be pure enough for galvanization, but not enough for die casting alloys, which requires special high-grade zinc (99.995% pure). In order to reach this purity the zinc must be refined.

The four types of commercial pyrometallurgical processes are the St. Joseph Minerals Corporation's (electrothermic) process, the blast furnace process, the New Jersey Zinc continuous vertical-retort process, and the Belgian-type horizontal retort process.

=== St. Joseph Mineral Company (electrothermic) process ===
This process was developed by the St. Joseph Mineral Company in 1930, and is the only pyrometallurgical process still used in the US to smelt zinc. The advantage of this system is that it is able to smelt a wide variety of zinc-bearing materials, including electric arc furnace dust. The disadvantage of this process is that it is less efficient than the electrolysis process.

The process begins with a downdraft sintering operation. The sinter, which is a mixture of roaster calcine and EAF (electric arc furnace) calcine, is loaded onto a gate type conveyor and then combustions gases are pumped through the sinter. The carbon in the combustion gases react with some impurities, such as lead, cadmium, and halides. These impurities are driven off into filtration bags. The sinter after this process, called product sinter, usually has a composition of 48% zinc, 8% iron, 5% aluminium, 4% silicon, 2.5% calcium, and smaller quantities of magnesium, lead, and other metals. The sinter product is then charged with coke into an electric retort furnace. A pair of graphite electrodes from the top and bottom of the furnace produce current flow through the mixture. The coke provides electrical resistance to the mixture in order to heat the mixture to 1,400 °C (2,550 °F) and produce carbon monoxide. These conditions allow for the following chemical reaction to occur:

$$\ce{ZnO + CO -> Zn (^) + CO2}$$

The zinc vapour and carbon dioxide pass to a vacuum condenser, where zinc is recovered by bubbling through a molten zinc bath. Over 95% of the zinc vapour leaving the retort is condensed to liquid zinc. The carbon dioxide is regenerated with carbon, and the carbon monoxide is recycled back to the retort furnace.

=== Blast furnace process (Imperial Smelting Process) ===
This process was developed by the National Smelting Company at Avonmouth Docks, England, in order to increase production, increase efficiency, and decrease labour and maintenance costs. L. J. Derham proposed using a spray of molten lead droplets to rapidly cool and absorb the zinc vapour, despite the high concentration of carbon dioxide. The mixture is then cooled, where the zinc separates from the lead. The first plant using this design opened up in 1950. One of the advantages of this process is that it can co-produce lead bullion and copper dross. In 1990, it accounted for 12% of the world's zinc production.

The process starts by charging solid sinter and heated coke into the top of the blast furnace. Preheated air at 190 to 1,050 °C (370 to 1,920 °F) is blown into the bottom of the furnace. Zinc vapour and sulfides leave through the top and enter the condenser. Slag and lead collect at the bottom of the furnace and are tapped off regularly. The zinc is scrubbed from the vapour in the condenser via liquid lead. The liquid zinc is separated from the lead in the cooling circuit. Approximately 5,000 metric tons (5,500 short tons) of lead are required each year for this process, however this process recovers 25% more lead from the starting ores than other processes.

=== New Jersey Zinc continuous vertical retort ===
The New Jersey Zinc process, US Pat 2,457,552.

The New Jersey Zinc process is no longer used to produce primary zinc in the U.S., in Europe and Japan, but it still is used to treat secondary operations. This process peaked in 1960, when it accounted for 5% of world zinc production. A modified version of this process is still used at a Huludao plant in China (originally established by the Japanese in 1937), which produced 65,000 metric tons per year as of 1991 and increased capacity to at least 210,000 t/year by 2023.

This process begins by roasting concentrates that are mixed with coal and briquetted in two stages. The briquettes are then heated in an autogenous coker at 700 °C (1,292 °F) and then charged into the retort. There are three reasons to briquette the calcine: to ensure free downward movement of the charge; to permit heat transfer across a practical size cross-section; to allow adequate porosity for the passage of reduced zinc vapour to the top of the retort. The reduced zinc vapour that is collected at the top of the retort is then condensed to a liquid.

Overpelt improved upon this design by using only one large condensation chamber, instead of many small ones, as it was originally designed. This allowed for the carbon monoxide to be recirculated into the furnaces for heating the retorts.

This process was licensed to the Imperial Smelting Corporation (ISC), based in Avonmouth, England, which had a large vertical retort (VR) plant in production for many years. It was used until the mid-1970s when it was superseded by the company's Imperial Smelting Furnace (ISF) plant. The VR plant was demolished in 1975.

=== Belgian-type horizontal retort process ===
This process was the main process used in Britain from the mid-19th century until 1951. The process was very inefficient as it was designed as a small scale batch operation. Each retort only produced 40 kilograms (88 lb) so companies would put them together in banks and used one large gas burner to heat all of them. The Belgian process requires redistillation to remove impurities of lead, cadmium, iron, copper, and arsenic.

== History ==
The first production of zinc in quantity seems to have been in India starting from 12th century and later in China from 16th century. In India, zinc was produced at Zawar from the 12th to the 18th centuries, although some zinc artifacts appear to have been made during classical antiquity in Europe. The sphalerite ore found here was presumably converted to zinc oxide via roasting, although no archaeological evidence of this has been found. Smelting is thought to have been done in sealed cylindrical clay retorts which were packed with a mixture of roasted ore, dolomite, and an organic material, perhaps cow dung, and then placed vertically in a furnace and heated to around 1100 °C. Carbon monoxide produced by the charring of the organic material would have reduced the zinc oxide to zinc vapour, which then liquefied in a conical clay condenser at the bottom of the retort, dripping down into a collection vessel. Over the period 1400–1800, production is estimated to have been about 200 kg/day. Zinc was also smelted in China from the mid-sixteenth century on.

Large-scale zinc production in Europe began with William Champion, who patented a zinc distillation process in 1738. In Champion's process, zinc ore (in this case, the carbonate, ZnCO_{3}) was sealed in large reduction pots with charcoal and heated in a furnace. The zinc vapor then descended through an iron condensing pipe until reaching a water-filled vessel at the bottom. Champion set up his first zinc works in Bristol, England, but soon expanded to Warmley and by 1754 had built four zinc furnaces there. Although Champion succeeded in producing about 200 tons of zinc, his business plans were not successful and he was bankrupt by 1769. However, zinc smelting continued in this area until 1880.

Evolution of the extracted zinc ore grade in Canada and Australia

Historical evolution of the production of zinc, extracted in different countries

Percentage of zinc produced by given methods
Year	Horizontal retort	Vertical retort	Electrothermic	Blast furnace	Electrolytic
<1916	>90				
1929					28
1937					c. 33
1960	34.5	11	7.5	2	45
1970	15	10	6.5	12.5	56
1980	3	7	6	10	74

Early European zinc production also took place in Silesia, in Carinthia, and in Liège, Belgium. In the Carinthian process, used in works established in 1798 by Bergrath Dillinger, a wood-fueled furnace heated a large number of small vertical retorts, and zinc vapor then dropped through a ceramic pipe into a common condensation chamber below. This process was out of use by 1840. The Belgian and Silesian processes both used horizontal retorts. In Silesia, Johann Ruhberg built a furnace to distill zinc in 1799, at first using pots but later changing to flat-bottomed retorts called "muffles", attached to horizontal tubes bent downwards in which the zinc condensed. The Silesian process eventually merged with the Belgian process. This process, developed by Jean-Jacques Daniel Dony, was introduced 1805–1810, and used retorts with a cylindrical cross-section. Condensers were horizontal clay tubes extending from the ends of the retorts. The merged "Belgo-Silesian" horizontal retort process was widely adopted in Europe by the third quarter of the 19th century, and later in the United States.

Experimental attempts to extract zinc via electrolysis begun in the 19th century, but the only commercially successful process before 1913 was through electrolysis of an aqueous zinc chloride solution, a process used in Great Britain and Austria. The Anaconda Copper Company, at Anaconda, Montana, and the Consolidated Mining and Smelting Company, at Trail, British Columbia, both built successful electrolytic plants in 1915 using the currently used zinc sulfate process. This method has continued to grow in importance and in 1975 accounted for 68% of world zinc production.

The continuous vertical retort process was introduced in 1929 by the New Jersey Zinc Company. This process used a retort with silicon carbide walls, around 9 meters high and with a cross section of 2 by 0.3 meters. The walls of the retort were heated to 1300 °C and briquettes consisting of sintered zinc ore, coke, coal, and recycled material were fed into the top of the retort. Gaseous zinc was drawn off from the top of the column and, after a 20-hour journey through the retort, spent briquettes were removed from the bottom. To condense the gaseous zinc, the company first used a simple brick chamber with carborundum baffles, but efficiency was poor. During the 1940s a condenser was developed which condensed the zinc vapor on a spray of liquid zinc droplets, thrown up by an electrical impeller.

The electrothermic process, developed by the St. Joseph's Lead Company, was somewhat similar. The first commercial plant using this process was built in 1930 at the present site of Josephtown, Pennsylvania. The electrothermic furnace was a steel cylinder around 15 meters high and 2 meters in diameter, lined with firebrick. A mixture of sintered ore and coke was fed into the top of the furnace, and a current of 10,000–20,000 amperes, at a potential difference of 240 volts, was applied between carbon electrodes in the furnace, raising the temperature to 1200–1400 °C. An efficient condenser was devised for this process from 1931–1936; it consisted of a bath of liquid zinc which the exhaust gases were drawn through by suction. The zinc content of the gas stream was absorbed into the liquid bath.

The blast-furnace process was developed starting in 1943 at Avonmouth, England by the Imperial Smelting Corporation, which became part of Rio Tinto Zinc in 1968. It uses a spray of molten lead droplets to condense the zinc vapor.

== See also ==
- Waelz process
