= BYD ESS =

BYD Energy Storage System (BYD ESS) is independently developed by the Chinese company BYD who begun with its battery manufacture business but later expands to diverse fields like new energy, EV etc., including energy type and power type. The energy type system can discharge for a long time, while the power type can supply big power for a short time. BYD Energy Storage System can realize, as the company announced, the function as below:frequency regulation, substation grid support, distributed energy storage system (DESS), PV/Wind integration, commercial energy management etc.

== Applications ==
- China's National Wind and Solar Energy Storage and Transmission Demonstration Project. Built in conjunction with a 140-megawatt wind- and solar-energy project in Zhangbei, this station is said as the "world's largest battery energy storage station." Hebei Province, the first phase investment of this project is worth over $500M USD (RMB~3.3 billion) and BYD's role in the project is primarily providing iron-phosphate batteries which offer 20-year service life theoretically, in arrays larger than football fields.

Capacity; 6 MW/36 MWh

Location; Zhangbei, Hebei, China

Operation Time; Dec. 1st, 2011

- China Southern Power Grid's Battery Energy Storage Station This ESS project is reckoned as the second-largest utility in the world, finished its construction in September, 2011, using battery technology supplied by BYD Energy.

Capacity; 3 MW/12 MWh

Location; Shenzhen, China

Operation Time; September, 2011

- BYD's 1MW Energy Storage Station in its China-based HQ

Capacity; 1 MW/4 MWh

Location; BYD Headquarters, Shenzhen, China

Operation Time; July, 2009

In addition, one 2 mW/4mwh Chevron Micro-Grid ESS and some other projects are said to have been established during past few years, yet lack of full media reports online and offline and no clear official release from BYD.
