= Manganese(II) phosphate =

Names
- IUPAC name Manganese (II) Phosphate
- Other names Manganese diphosphate; Manganese phosphate tribasic

Identifiers
| CAS Number | 51349-94-1; 14154-09-7 |
| 3D model (JSmol) | Interactive image |
| ChemSpider | 8126114 |
| ECHA InfoCard | 100.034.529 |
| EC Number | 237-997-9 |
| PubChem CID | 9950503 |
| CompTox Dashboard (EPA) | DTXSID20872544 |
- InChI: InChI=1S/3Mn.2H3O4P/c;;;2*1-5(2,3)4/h;;;2*(H3,1,2,3,4)/q3*+2;;/p-6 Key: ZKCBQOQPFCSEFF-UHFFFAOYSA-H
- SMILES: [O-]P(=O)([O-])[O-].[O-]P(=O)([O-])[O-].[Mn+2].[Mn+2].[Mn+2]

Properties
| Chemical formula | Mn_{3}(PO_{4})_{2} |
| Molar mass | 354.76 g/mol |

Hazards
- GHS labelling
| Pictograms | (GHS07: Exclamation mark) (GHS08: Health hazard) |
| Signal word | Warning |
| Hazard statements | H319, H373, H412 |
| Precautionary statements | P260, P264, P273, P305+P351+P338, P314, P337+P313 |
- Safety data sheet (SDS)
- Except where otherwise noted, data are given for materials in their standard state (at 25 °C [77 °F], 100 kPa). Infobox references

Manganese(II) phosphate is an inorganic compound with the chemical formula Mn_{3}(PO_{4})_{2}. It has industrial importance as a constituent of manganese based phosphate conversion coatings.

== Formation ==
Manganese phosphates often combine with iron phosphates through paragenesis. In the process of paragenesis, each mineral affects the manner in which the other is crystallized. The minerals combine in isomorphic series, meaning that they crystallize in similar forms, producing a sequence of solids. Some examples of “isomorphic series” formed by Mn and Fe include heterosite (Fe,Mn)PO_{4}, purpurite (Mn,Fe)PO_{4}, and triplite (Mn,Fe)PO_{4}.

== Processing ==
The immersion method is used for the processing of manganese phosphate coatings. The steps of immersion include degreasing/cleaning, water rinses, pickling in mineral acid, activation, manganese phosphating, an optional final drying, and lubrication using oils or emulsion. The first step of this method is to degrease and clean, typically with strong alkaline cleaners. Pickling in mineral acid is a useful process described by the removal of oxide, resulting in a clean surface. The water pre-rinse activation allows the cleaning and pickling to take place while avoiding the formation of coarse-crystalline phosphate. Manganese phosphating is performed, typically in a bath of dilute phosphoric acid that is at approximately 95 °C (203 °F) for about 5–20 minutes (the time varies with the state of the surface being coated). The elements that were coated are then allowed to dry, possibly in an oven. The final step of manganese phosphate coating is to lubricate the materials with oil by immersing them in the oil bath and then letting them drain. This results in different thicknesses of oil when different concentrations and types of oil are used.

Manganese phosphate can also be used for coatings (which are processed as described above). These coatings are useful for protection against corrosion and wear over time, due to their toughness. Manganese phosphate coating can often be found in the oil and gas industry, firearms and ordnance, aerospace, gears and bearings, and in marine equipment. They are also common in engines, screws, nuts and bolts, and washers.
