= Iron phosphate =

Iron phosphate may refer to:

- Iron(II) phosphate
- Iron(III) phosphate

== See also ==
- Strengite, a hydrated iron phosphate mineral
