= Tin pest =

Deterioration of tin objects at low temperature

External videos
- tin pest, transformation of beta tin into alpha modification (grey tin) on YouTube; Time lapse video of tin pest on an ingot

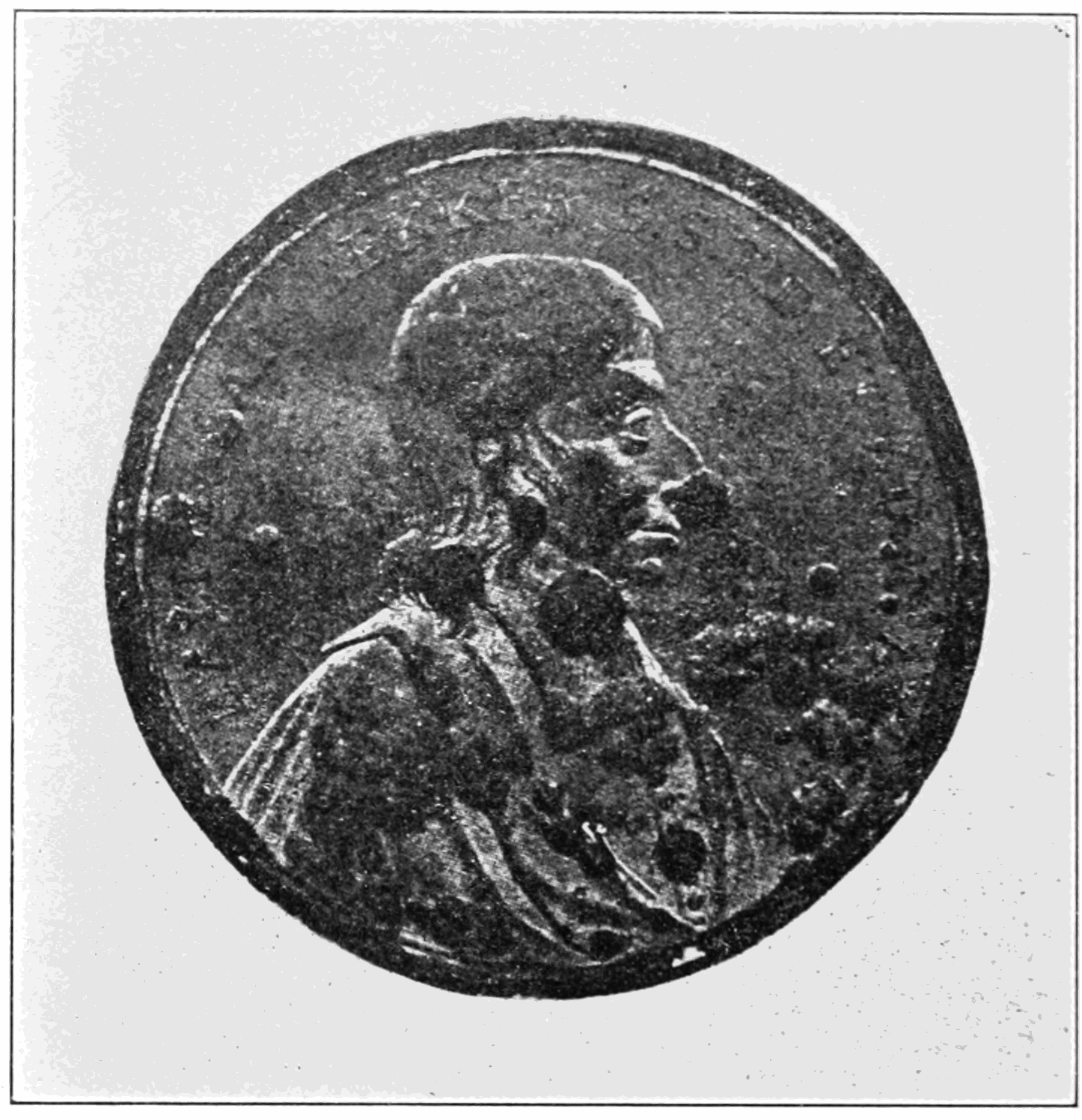
Tin medal affected by tin pest

Tin pest is an autocatalytic, allotropic transformation of the element tin, which causes deterioration of tin objects at low temperatures. Tin pest has also been called tin disease, tin blight, tin plague, or tin leprosy. It is an autocatalytic process, accelerating once it begins. It was first documented in the scientific literature in 1851, having been observed in the pipes of pipe organs in medieval churches that had experienced cool climates.

With the adoption of the 2003 Restriction of Hazardous Substances Directive (RoHS) regulations in Europe, and similar regulations elsewhere, traditional lead/tin solder alloys in electronic devices have been replaced by nearly pure tin, introducing tin pest and related problems such as tin whiskers.

== Allotropic transformation ==
At 13.2 °C (55.8 °F) and below, pure tin transforms from the silvery, ductile metallic allotrope of β-form white tin to the brittle, nonmetallic, α-form grey tin with a diamond cubic structure. The transformation is slow to initiate due to a high activation energy but the presence of germanium (or crystal structures of similar form and size) or very low temperatures of roughly −30 °C aids the initiation. There is also a large volume increase of about 27% associated with the phase change to the nonmetallic low temperature allotrope. This frequently makes tin objects (such as buttons) decompose into powder during the transformation, hence the name tin pest. The decomposition will catalyze itself, which is why the reaction accelerates once it starts. The mere presence of tin pest leads to more tin pest. Tin objects at low temperatures will simply disintegrate.

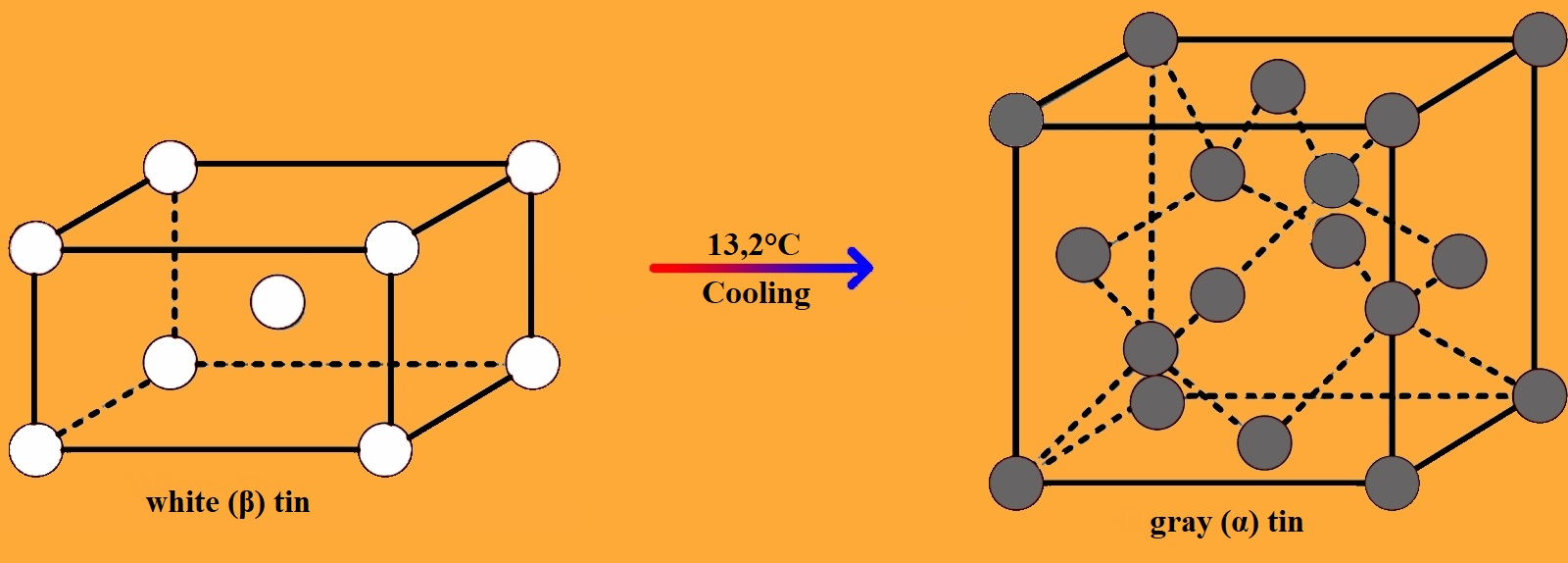
Allotropic transformation of tin.

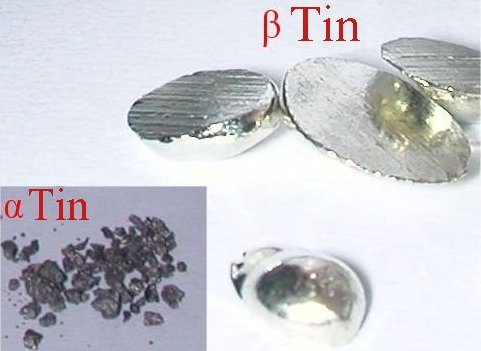
Allotropic forms of tin.

=== Prevention ===
Tin pest can be avoided by alloying with small amounts of electropositive metals or semimetals soluble in tin's solid phase, e.g. antimony or bismuth, which prevent the phase change.

Impurities (e.g. Al, Zn, etc.) lower the transformation temperature well below 0 °C (32 °F). With the addition of antimony or bismuth the transformation might not occur at all, increasing durability. Commercial grades of tin (99.8% tin content) resist transformation because of the inhibiting effect of small amounts of bismuth, antimony, lead, and silver present as impurities.

== History ==
=== Organ pipes ===
Reports of tin pest in organ pipes in churches appeared as early as 1467 in St James' Church, Lübeck, Germany. Similar reports appeared in Italy in Saint Nicola church in Almenno San Salvatore in 1558, in Prato Cathedral in 1588 and in Castelferretti in 1700.

O. L. Erdman was the first to publish the problem of tin pest in a chemistry journal in 1851, having observed pustules and exfoliation in pipe organs in Moritzburg Castle.

=== Other historical examples ===
==== Napoleon's buttons ====
The story is often told of Napoleon's men freezing in the bitter Russian Winter, their clothes falling apart as tin pest destroyed the buttons. Although uniform buttons of that era were generally bone for enlisted, and brass for officers, some of the regiments in the campaign had tin buttons and the temperature reached sufficiently low values (below −40 °C or °F).

However, the story appears to be an urban legend, as none of the many survivors' tales mention any problems with tin buttons. Critics of the theory also point out that any tin that might have been used would have been quite impure, and thus more tolerant of low temperatures. Laboratory tests of the time required for unalloyed tin to develop significant tin pest damage at lowered temperatures is about 18 months, which is more than twice the length of the invasion.

It has been suggested that the legend is an amalgamation of reports of blocks of Banca tin completely disintegrating in a customs warehouse in St. Petersburg in 1868, earlier Russian reports of cast-in buttons for military uniforms being damaged, and the desperate state of Napoleon's army, having turned soldiers into ragged beggars.

==== Scott expedition to Antarctica ====
In 1910 British polar explorer Robert Scott hoped to be the first to reach the South Pole, but was beaten by Norwegian explorer Roald Amundsen. On foot, the expedition trudged through the frozen deserts of the Antarctic, marching for caches of food and kerosene deposited on the way. In early 1912, at the first cache, there was no kerosene; the cans—soldered with tin— had emptied. The cause of the empty tins could have been related to tin pest. The tin cans were recovered, however, and no tin pest was found when analyzed by the Tin Research Institute. Hence some observers simply blame poor quality soldering, inasmuch tin cans over 80 years old have been discovered in Antarctic buildings with the soldering in good condition.

== Modern tin pest since adoption of RoHS ==
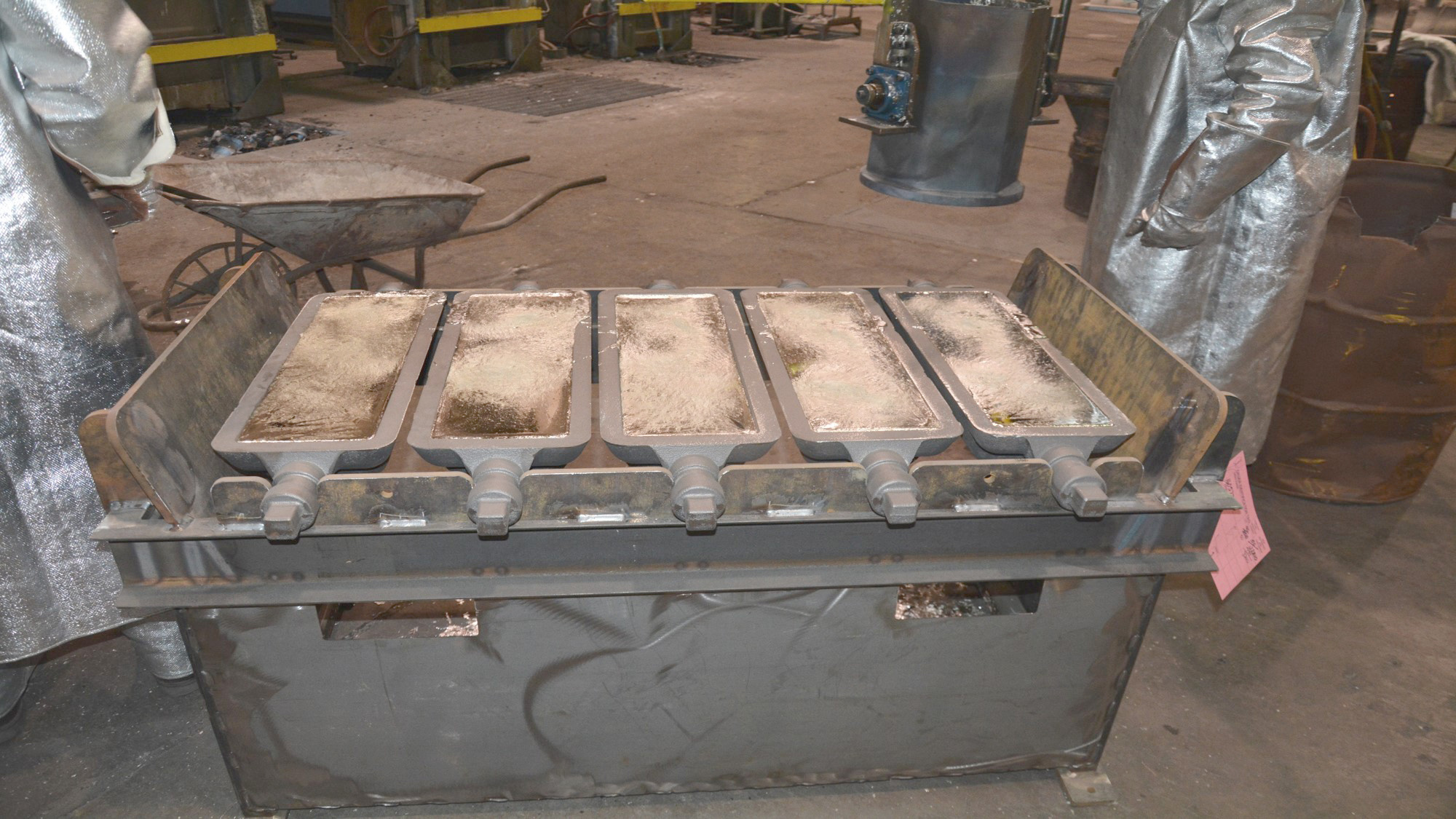
Re-melted tin affected with tin pest is poured into ingot molds at Rock Island Arsenal Joint Manufacturing and Technology Center, Rock Island, Illinois, in 2017.

With the 2003 adoption of the Restriction of Hazardous Substances Directive (RoHS) regulations in the European Union, the banning of most uses of lead in California, and similar regulations elsewhere, the problem of tin pest has returned, since some manufacturers which previously used tin/lead alloys now use predominantly tin-based alloys. For example, the leads of some electrical and electronic components are plated with pure tin. In cold environments, this can change to α-modification grey tin, which is not electrically conductive, and falls off the leads. After reheating, it changes back to β-modification white tin, which is electrically conductive. This cycle can cause electrical short circuits and failure of equipment. Such problems can be intermittent as the powdered particles of tin move around.

== See also ==
- Bronze disease – destruction of bronze artifacts by corrosion
- Gold–aluminium intermetallic – giving rise to Purple plague or White plague, another failure mode for electronic components due to the formation of a crystalline substance.
- Zinc pest – decay of zinc by an unrelated intercrystalline corrosion process.
