= Wet storage stain =

Type of zinc corrosion

Wet storage stain, more commonly known as white rust or white corrosion, is a type of zinc corrosion product. It is called wet storage stain because it occurs when a fresh zinc surface, oftentimes newly galvanized steel, is stored in a wet environment with limited airflow; the restriction in air is usually due to the items being stacked on one another or otherwise stored in close quarters or humid conditions. This type of corrosion does not usually occur to zinc surfaces that have had time to form their normal layers of corrosion protection or weather.

== Chemistry ==
Wet storage stain is a white, crumbly, and porous substance that is a mixture of three chemical compounds: 2ZnCO_{3}·3Zn(OH)_{2}, ZnO, and β-Zn(OH)_{2}. Underneath the white coating is usually a dark gray surface. The corrosion product is very voluminous; it is approximately 100 times greater in volume than the zinc consumed. Because of this the corrosion is not usually detrimental to the usability of the item, unless the zinc surface is only a thin coating, such as zinc electroplating.

Wet storage stain only occurs in situations where there is a lack of oxygen or carbon dioxide, because it usually forms zinc oxide and zinc hydroxide in open air environments. These oxides are usually present on zinc surfaces, but do not protect them from wet storage stain because they are only loosely adherent to the surface and any moisture can attack the oxides from underneath. Also, chlorides and sulfates accelerate the formation of corrosion.

== Removal ==
To stop the corrosion from continuing the object just needs to be aired out to remove any moisture and allow the normal layer of protection to form. Washing and a wire brush will remove most of the corrosion. For complete removal, 10% acetic acid or a mixture of polishing chalk and 20–40% NaOH can be used. Both require a thorough water rinsing afterward and do not restore lustrous surface finish if one was previously present.

== Prevention ==
Wet storage stain can be prevented for a limited amount of time by coating in a light oil, chromate conversion coatings, or phosphate conversion coatings. A more permanent solution is to paint the surface.
