= Cronak process =

Chromate conversion coating process

The Cronak process is a conventional chromate conversion coating process developed in 1933 by The New Jersey Zinc Company. It involves immersing a zinc or zinc-plated article for 5 to 15 seconds in a chromate solution, typically prepared from sodium dichromate and sulfuric acid. The process was patented in the United States on March 24, 1936 with USPTO number 2,035,380.
