= Zinc pest =

Type of corrosion in zinc

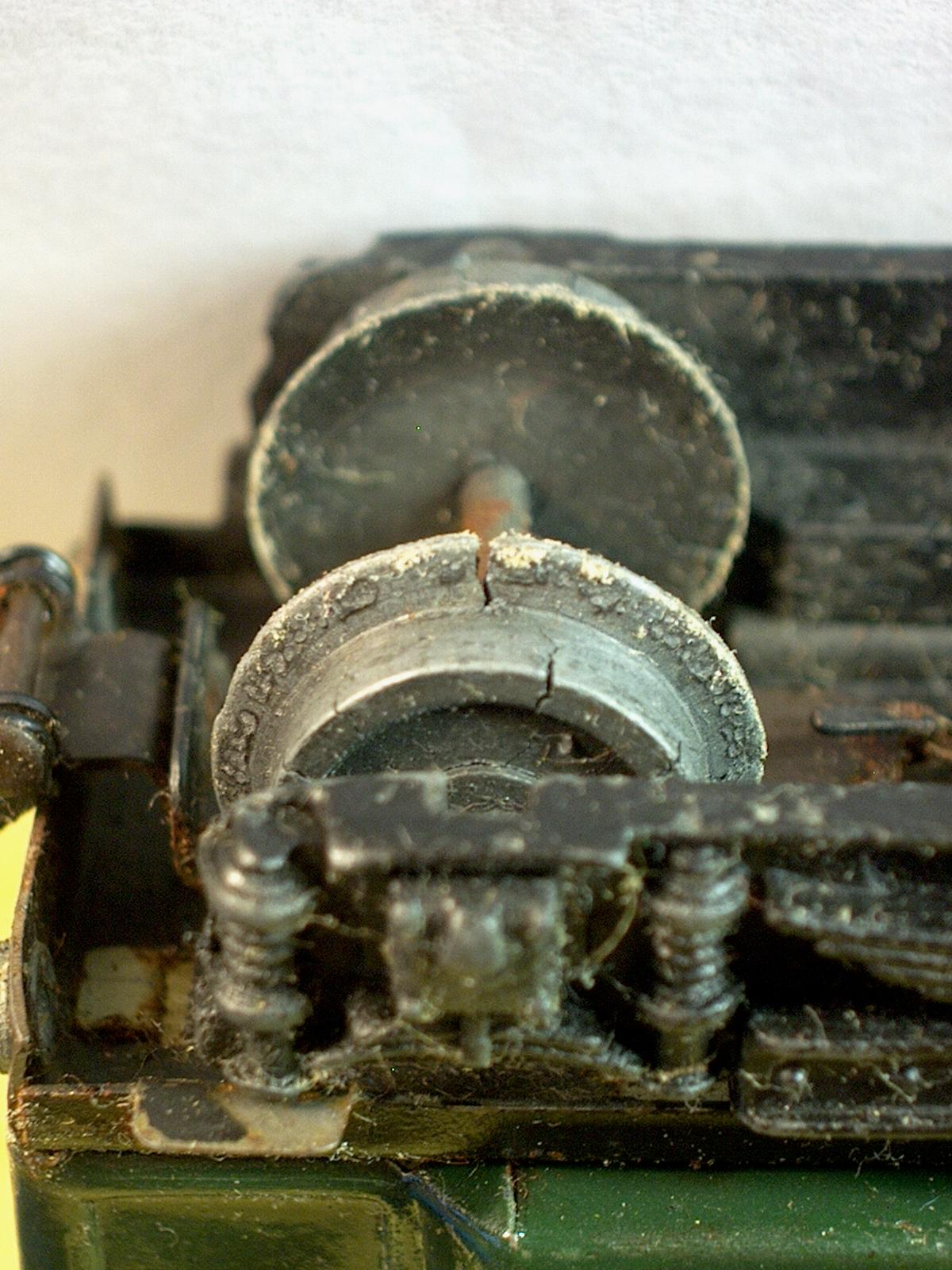
The wheels of a Märklin model railroad car 344.6 (H0, 1947–1949), affected by zinc pest

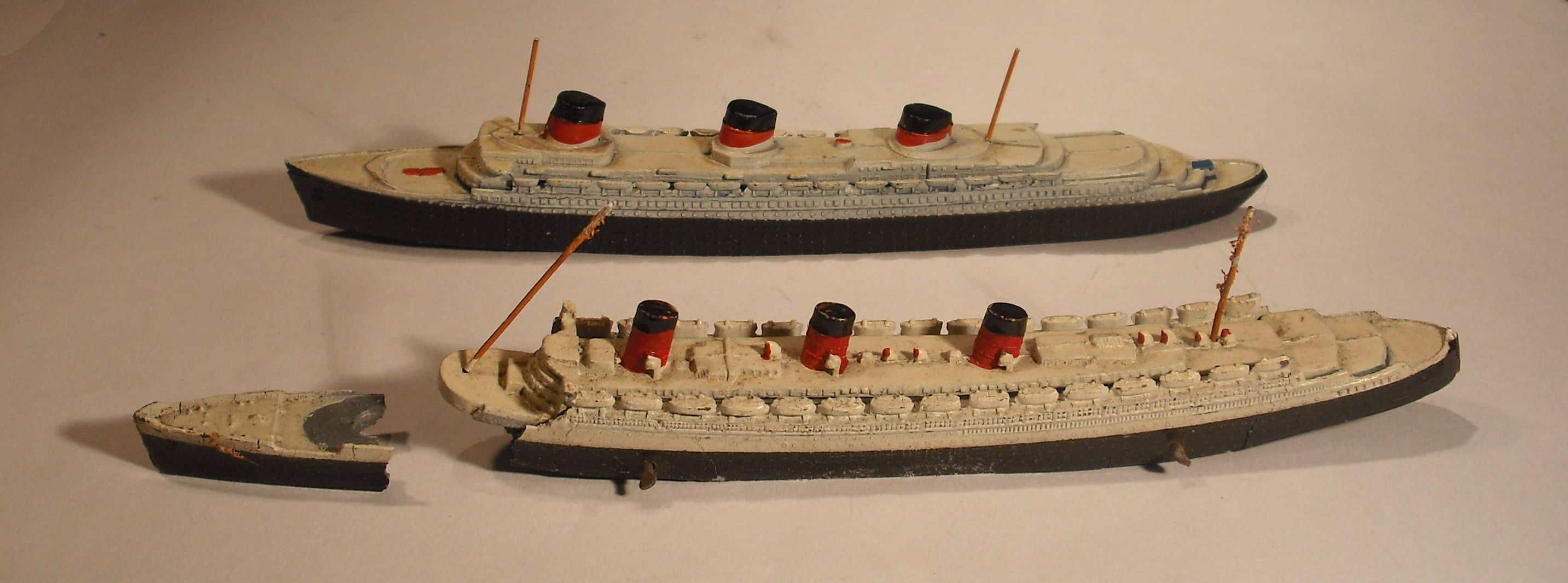
Two 1930s Dinky Toys liners of equal age and storage history, one badly affected, the other not

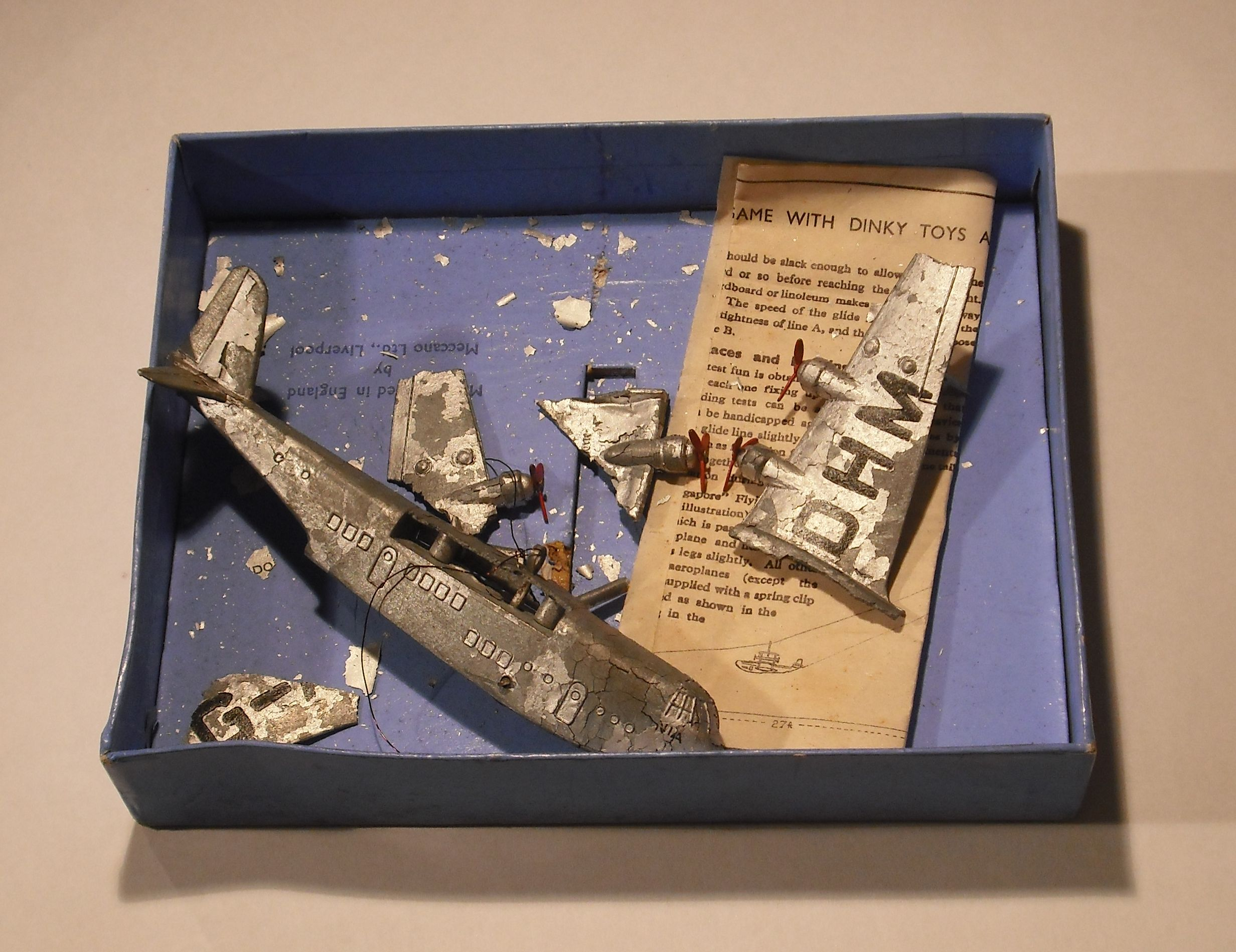
Dinky Toy aircraft, completely fragmented by zinc pest

Zinc pest (from German Zinkpest "zinc plague"), also known as zinc rot, mazak rot and zamak rot, is a destructive, intercrystalline corrosion process of zinc alloys containing lead impurities. While impurities of the alloy are the primary cause of the problem, environmental conditions such as high humidity (greater than 65%) may accelerate the process.

It was first discovered to be a problem in 1923, and primarily affects die-cast zinc articles that were manufactured during the 1920s through 1950s. The New Jersey Zinc Company developed zamak alloys in 1929 using 99.99% pure zinc metal to avoid the problem, and articles made after 1960 are usually considered free of the risk of zinc pest since the use of purer materials and more controlled manufacturing conditions make zinc pest degradation unlikely.

Affected objects may show surface irregularities such as small cracks and fractures, blisters or pitting. Over time, the material slowly expands, cracking, buckling and warping in an irreversible process that makes the object exceedingly brittle and prone to fracture, and can eventually shatter the object, destroying it altogether. Due to the expansion process, attached normal material may also be damaged. The occurrence and severity of zinc pest in articles made of susceptible zinc alloys depends both on the concentration of lead impurities in the metal and on the storage conditions of the article in the ensuing decades. Zinc pest is dreaded by collectors of vintage die-cast model trains, toys, or radios, because rare or otherwise valuable items can inescapably be rendered worthless as the process of zinc pest destroys them. Because castings of the same object were usually made from various batches of metal over the production process, some examples of a given toy or model may survive today completely unaffected, while other identical examples may have completely disintegrated. It has also affected carburetors, hubcaps, door handles and automobile trim on cars of the 1920s and 1930s.

Since the 1940s, some model railroad hobbyists have claimed, with varying degrees of success, that a method of "pickling" zinc alloy parts by soaking them in vinegar or oxalic acid solution for several minutes before painting and assembling them could prevent or delay the effects of zinc pest.

Engine parts of older vehicles or airplanes, and military medals made of zinc alloys, may also be affected. In addition, the post-1982 copper-plated zinc Lincoln cents have been known to be affected.

Zinc pest is not related to tin pest, and is also different from a superficial white corrosion oxidation process ("Weissrost") that affects some zinc articles.

== See also ==
- Bronze disease
