= Iron(II) phosphate =

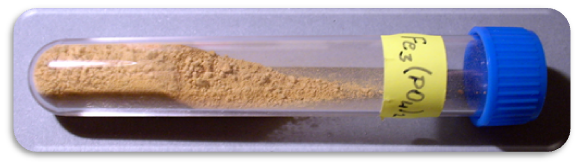

Names
- IUPAC name Iron(II) phosphate
- Other names Ferrous phosphate

Identifiers
CAS Number	14940-41-1
3D model (JSmol)	Interactive image
ChemSpider	8039263
ECHA InfoCard	100.035.456
EC Number	239-018-0
PubChem CID	9863567
UNII	D07L04MRWI
CompTox Dashboard (EPA)	DTXSID20872569
- InChI: InChI=1S/3Fe.2H3O4P/c;;;2*1-5(2,3)4/h;;;2*(H3,1,2,3,4)/q3*+2;;/p-6 Key: SDEKDNPYZOERBP-UHFFFAOYSA-H
- SMILES: [O-]P(=O)([O-])[O-].[O-]P(=O)([O-])[O-].[Fe+2].[Fe+2].[Fe+2]

Properties
Chemical formula	Fe_{3}(PO_{4})_{2}
Appearance	brown powder
Density	2.61 g/cm^{3} (octahydrate)
Melting point	180 °C (356 °F; 453 K) (octahydrate) decomposes
Solubility in water	insoluble

Structure
Crystal structure	monoclinic (octahydrate)
Space group	C 2/m
Lattice constant	a = 10.086 (octahydrate), b = 13.441 (octahydrate), c = 4.703 (octahydrate) α = 90°, β = 104.27°, γ = 90°

Hazards
- GHS labelling
Pictograms	(GHS07: Exclamation mark)
Signal word	Warning
Hazard statements	H315, H319, H335
Precautionary statements	P261, P280, P304+P340, P305+P351+P338, P405, P501
NFPA 704 (fire diamond)	2 1 0
- Except where otherwise noted, data are given for materials in their standard state (at 25 °C [77 °F], 100 kPa). Infobox references

Iron(II) phosphate, also ferrous phosphate, Fe_{3}(PO_{4})_{2}, is an iron salt of phosphoric acid.

== Occurrence ==
The mineral vivianite is a naturally occurring form of hydrated iron(II) phosphate.

== Production ==
It can be formed by the reaction of ferrous hydroxide with phosphoric acid to produce hydrated iron(II) phosphate.

== See also ==
- Iron(III) phosphate
