= Zinc aluminium =

Alloy

Zinc-aluminium (ZA) alloys are alloys whose main constituents are zinc and aluminium. Other alloying elements include magnesium and copper. This type of alloy was originally developed for gravity casting. Noranda, New Jersey Zinc Co. Ltd., St. Joe Mineral Co. and the International Lead Zinc Research Organization (ILZRO) were the main companies that pioneered the ZA alloys between the 1950s and the 1970s. They were designed to compete with bronze, cast iron and aluminium using sand and permanent mold casting methods. Distinguishing features of ZA alloys include high as-cast strength, excellent bearing properties, as well as low energy requirements (for melting).

ZA alloys make good bearings because their final composition includes hard eutectic zinc-aluminium-copper particles embedded in a softer zinc-aluminium matrix. The hard particles provide a low-friction bearing surface, while the softer material wears back to provide space for lubricant to flow, similar to Babbitt metal.

The numbers associated with the name represent the amount of aluminium in the alloy (i.e. ZA8 has 8% aluminium).

Properties of various zinc aluminium alloys
	ZA8		ZA12		ZA27	
Mechanical properties	Sand cast	Permanent mold	Sand cast	Permanent mold	Sand cast	Permanent mold
Ultimate tensile strength [ksi (MPa)]	38 (263)	32-37 (221-255)	40-46 (276-317)	45-50 (310-345)	58-64 (400-441)	45-47 (310-324)
Yield strength - 0.2% offset [ksi (MPa)]	29 (200)	30 (206)	31 (214)	39 (269)	54 (372)	37 (255)
Elongation [% in 2"]	1-2	1-2	1-3	1-3	3-6	8-11
Shear strength [ksi (MPa)]	-	35 (241)	37 (255)	-	42 (290)	33 (228)
Hardness [Brinell]	85	85-90	89-105	89-105	110-120	90-110
Impact strength [ft·lbf (J)]	156 (20)	-	193 (25)	-	353 (47)	433 (58)
Fatigue strength rotary bend in 5 × 10^{8} cycles [ksi (MPa)]	-	7.5 (52)	15 (103)	-	25 (172)	15 (103)
Compressive yield strength 0.1% offset [ksi (MPa)]	29 (199)	31 (214)	33 (227)	34 (234)	48 (331)	37 (255)
Modulus of elasticity [psi × 10^{6} (GPa)]	12.4 (85.5)	12.47 (85.5)	12.07 (82.7)	12.07 (82.7)	11.37 (77.9)	11.37 (77.9)
Poisson's ratio	0.29	0.29	0.30	0.30	0.32	0.32
Physical properties	Sand cast	Permanent mold	Sand cast	Permanent mold	Sand cast	Permanent mold
Density [lb/in^{3} (g/cm^{3})]	.227 (6.3)	0.227 (6.3)	0.218 (6.0)	0.218 (6.0)	0.181 (5.0)	0.181 (5.0)
Melting Range	375-404°C (707-759°F)	375-404°C (707-759°F)	377-432°C (710-810°F)	377-432°C (710-810°F)	376-484°C (708-903°F)	376-484°C (708-903°F)
Electrical Conductivity [S/m (%IACS)]	1.61 (27.7)	1.61 (27.7)	1.64 (28.3)	1.64 (28.3)	1.72 (29.7)	1.72 (29.7)
Thermal Conductivity [BTU/hr/ft^{2}/°R (W/m/K)]	66.3 (114.7)	66.3 (114.7)	67.1 (116.1)	67.1 (116.1)	72.5 (125.5)	72.5 (125.5)
CTE [68-212°F μin/in/°R (100-200°C μm/m/K)]	12.9 (23.3)	12.9 (23.3)	13.4 (24.2)	13.4 (24.2)	14.4 (26.0)	14.4 (26.0)
Specific Heat [BTU/lb/°R (J/kg/K)]	.104 (435)	.104 (435)	.107 (448)	.107 (448)	.125 (523)	.125 (523)
Pattern of Die Shrinkage [in/ft (mm/m)]	1/8 (10.4)	1/8 (10.4)	5/32 (13.0)	5/32 (13.0)	5/32 (13.0)	5/32 (13.0)

Chemical Specification (per ASTM) (% by Weight)
	ZA8		ZA12		ZA27	
Composition	Ingot	Casting	Ingot	Casting	Ingot	Casting
Al	8.2-8.8	8.0-8.8	10.8-11.5	10.5-11.5	25.5-28.0	25.0-28.0
Mg	.020-.030	.015-.030	.020-.030	.015-.030	.012-.020	.010-.020
Cu	0.8-1.3	0.8-1.3	0.5-1.2	0.5-1.2	2.0-2.5	2.0-2.5
Fe (max)	.065	.075	.065	.075	.072	.075
Pb (max)	.005	.006	.005	.006	.005	.006
Cd	.005	.006	.005	.006	.005	.006
Sn (max)	.002	.003	.002	.003	.002	.003
Ni (other)x10	-	-	-	-	-	-
Zn	Bal	Bal	Bal	Bal	Bal	Bal
Color Code ASTM B908	Blue	Blue	Orange	Orange	Purple	Purple

== See also ==
- ZAMAK
- Zincalume
