= Iron(III) phosphate =

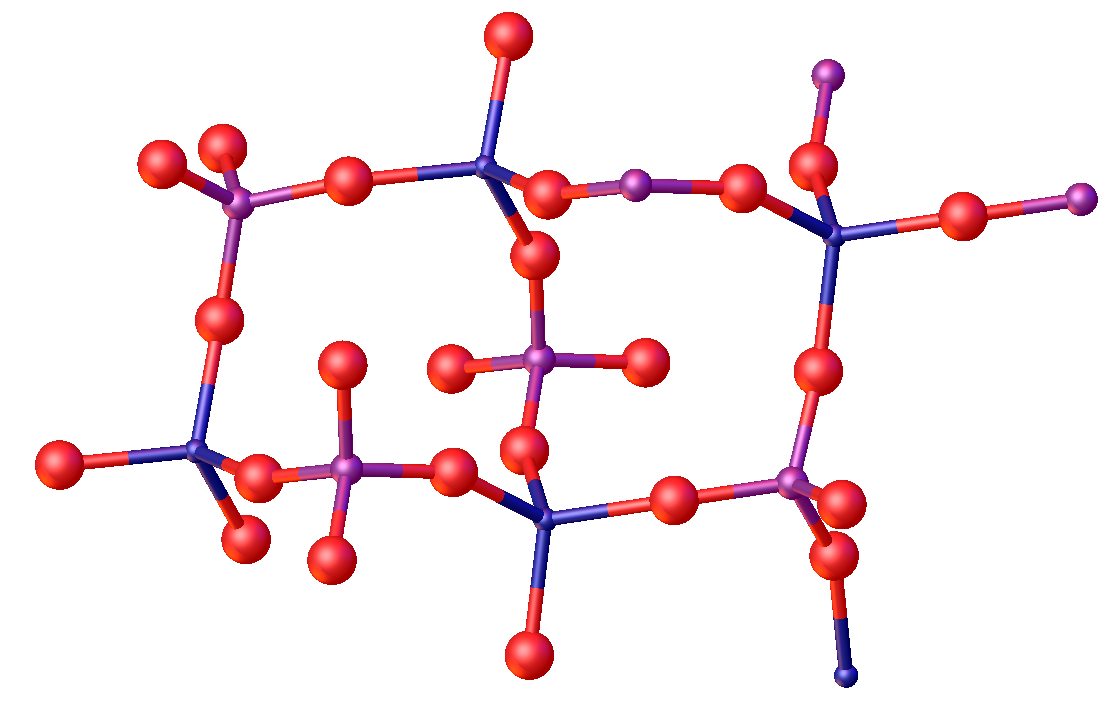

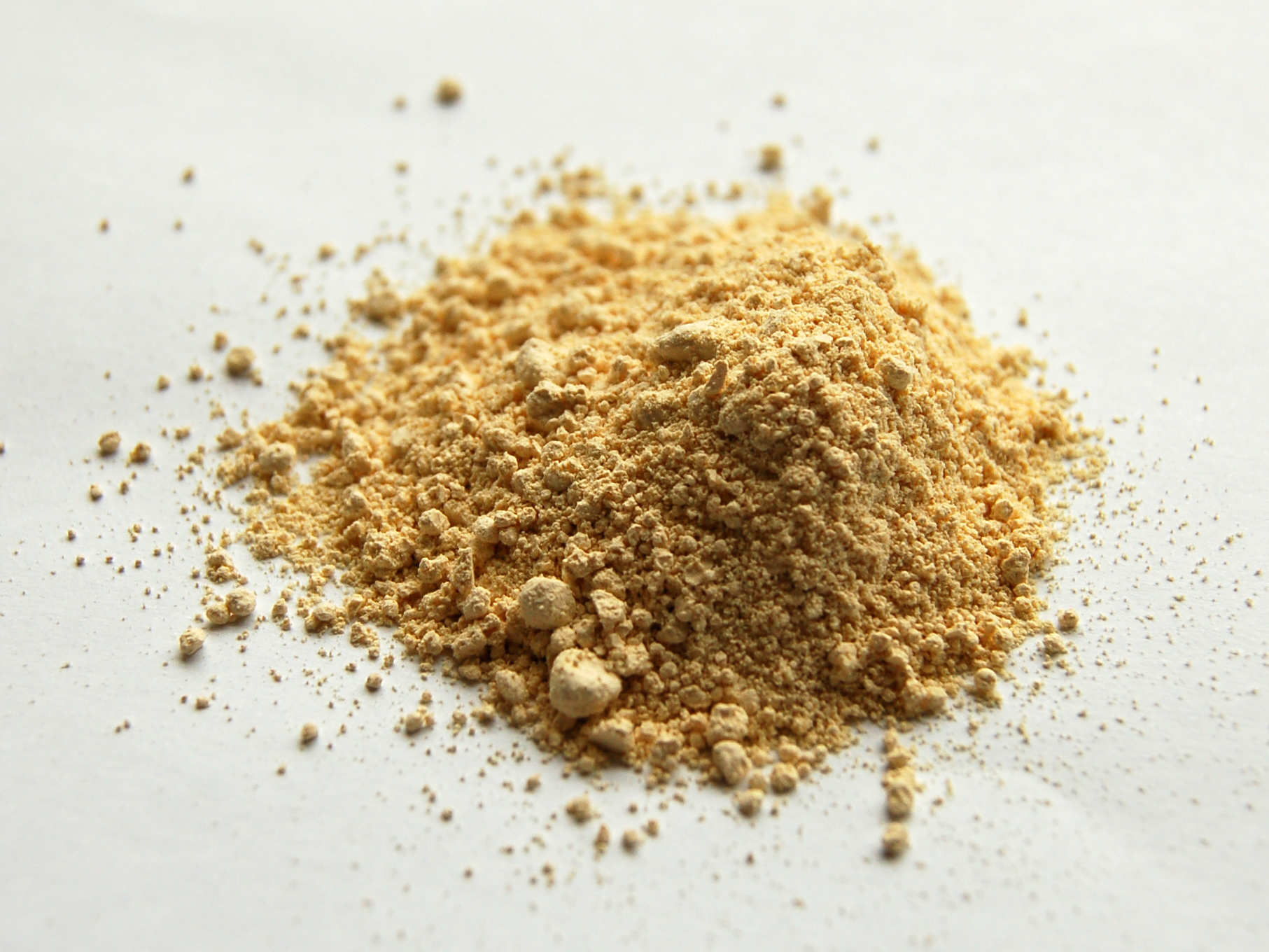

Names
- IUPAC name Iron(III) phosphate
- Other names Ferric orthophosphate, Ferric phosphate

Identifiers
CAS Number	10045-86-0 (anhydrous); 13463-10-0 (dihydrate)
3D model (JSmol)	Interactive image
ChEBI	CHEBI:131371
ChemSpider	23244
ECHA InfoCard	100.030.123
PubChem CID	24861
UNII	N6BAA189V1
CompTox Dashboard (EPA)	DTXSID9035672
- InChI: InChI=1S/Fe.H3O4P/c;1-5(2,3)4/h;(H3,1,2,3,4)/q+3;/p-3 Key: WBJZTOZJJYAKHQ-UHFFFAOYSA-K
- SMILES: [O-]P(=O)([O-])[O-].[Fe+3]

Properties
Chemical formula	FePO_{4}
Molar mass	150.815 g/mol (anhydrous)
Appearance	yellow-brown solid
Density	3.056 g/cm^{3} (anhydrous); 2.87 g/cm^{3} (20 °C, dihydrate)
Melting point	250 °C (482 °F; 523 K) (dihydrate) decomposes
Solubility in water	anhydrous: insoluble dihydrate: 0.642 g/100 mL (100 °C)
Solubility product (K_{sp})	9.91×10^{−16}
Magnetic susceptibility (χ)	+11,500.0·10^{−6} cm^{3}/mol

Thermochemistry
Heat capacity (C)	180.5 J/mol·K (dihydrate)
Std molar entropy (S^{⦵}_{298})	171.3 J/mol·K (dihydrate)
Std enthalpy of formation (Δ_{f}H^{⦵}_{298})	−1888 kJ/mol (dihydrate)

Hazards
- GHS labelling
Pictograms	(GHS07: Exclamation mark)
Signal word	Warning
Hazard statements	H315, H319, H335
Precautionary statements	P261, P305+P351+P338
- Except where otherwise noted, data are given for materials in their standard state (at 25 °C [77 °F], 100 kPa). Infobox references

Iron(III) phosphate or ferric phosphate is an inorganic compound with the formula FePO_{4}. Four polymorphs of anhydrous FePO_{4} are known. Additionally, two polymorphs of the dihydrate FePO_{4}·(H_{2}O)_{2} are known. These polymorphs have attracted interest as potential cathode materials in batteries.

== Structure ==
The most common form of FePO_{4} adopts the structure of α-quartz. As such the material consists of tetrahedral Fe(III) and phosphate sites. As such the P and Fe have tetrahedral molecular geometry. At high pressures, a phase change occurs to a more dense structure with octahedral Fe centres. Two orthorhombic structures and a monoclinic phase are also known. In the two polymorphs of the dihydrate, the Fe centre is octahedral with two mutually cis water ligands.

== Uses ==
Iron(III) phosphate can be used in steel and metal manufacturing processes. When bonded to a metal surface, iron phosphate prevents further oxidation of the metal. Its presence is partially responsible for the corrosion resistance of the iron pillar of Delhi.

Iron phosphate coatings are commonly used in preparation for painting or powder coating, in order to increase adhesion to the iron or steel substrate, and prevent corrosion, which can cause premature failure of subsequent coating processes.

It can also be used for bonding fabrics, wood, and other materials to iron or steel surfaces.

Iron phosphate is used to make lithium iron phosphate, the cathode in lithium iron phosphate batteries.

=== Pesticide ===
Iron phosphate is one of the few molluscicides approved for use in the practice of organic farming. Pesticide pellets can contain iron phosphate alone, or with a chelating agent, such as EDTA.

== Mineral ==
Strengite is the mineral form of hydrated ferric phosphate.

== Legislation ==
Iron(III) phosphate is not allowed as food additive in the European Union. It was withdrawn from the list of allowed substances in the directive 2002/46/EC in 2007.

== See also ==
- Iron(II) phosphate, commonly known as ferrous phosphate, the lower phosphate of iron
- Lithium iron phosphate battery, a battery that uses iron phosphate
- Phosphate conversion coating, an industrial process used to protect newly manufactured iron and steel from corrosion
