= Chromate conversion coating =

Chemical treatment of metals

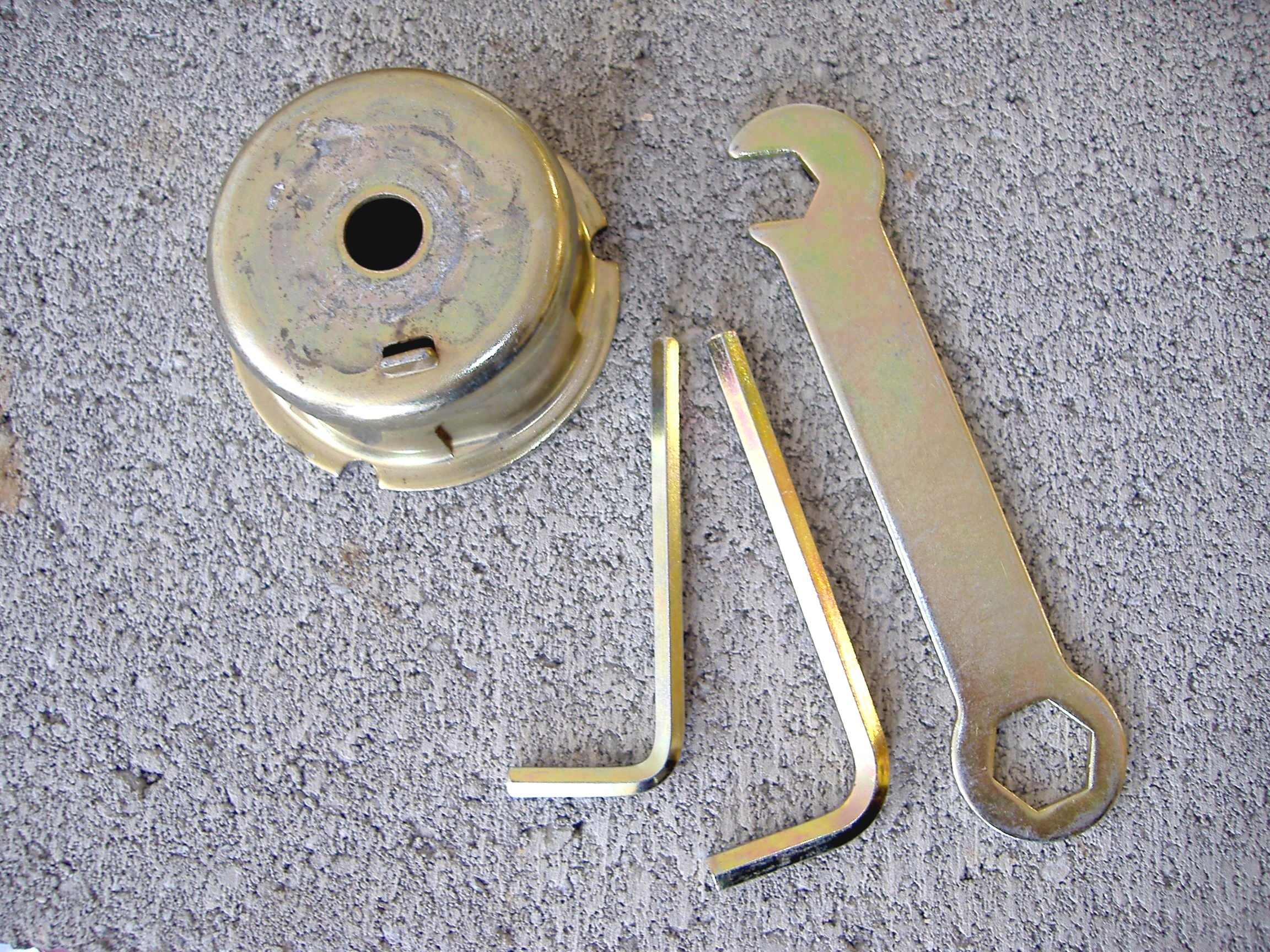
Zinc chromate conversion coating on small steel parts.

Chromate conversion coating or alodine coating is a type of conversion coating used to passivate steel, aluminium, zinc, cadmium, copper, silver, titanium, magnesium, and tin alloys. The coating serves as a corrosion inhibitor, as a primer to improve the adherence of paints and adhesives, as a decorative finish, or to preserve electrical conductivity. It also provides some resistance to abrasion and light chemical attack (such as bare fingers) on soft metals.

Chromate conversion coatings are commonly applied to items such as screws, hardware and tools. They usually impart a distinctively iridescent, greenish-yellow color to otherwise white or gray metals. The coating has a non-stoichiometric composition that includes chromium salts, arranged in a complex structure.

The process is sometimes called alodine coating, a term used specifically in reference to the trademarked Alodine process of Henkel Surface Technologies.

== Process ==
Chromate conversion coatings are usually applied by immersing the part in a chemical bath until a film of the desired thickness has formed, removing the part, rinsing it and letting it dry. The process is usually carried out at room temperature, with a few minutes of immersion. Alternatively, the solution can be sprayed, or the part can be briefly dipped in the bath, in which case the coating reactions take place while the part is still wet.

The coating is soft and gelatinous when first applied, but hardens and becomes hydrophobic as it dries, typically in 24 hours or less. Curing can be accelerated by heating to 70 °C (158 °F), but higher temperature will gradually damage the coating on steel.

=== Bath composition ===
The composition of the bath varies greatly, depending on the material to be coated and the desired effect. Most bath formulae are proprietary.

The formulations typically contain hexavalent chromium compounds, such as chromates and dichromates.

The widely used Cronak process for zinc and cadmium consists of 5–10 seconds of immersion in a room-temperature solution consisting of 182 g/L sodium dichromate (Na_{2}Cr_{2}O_{7} · 2H_{2}O) and 6 mL/L concentrated sulfuric acid.

=== Chemistry ===
The chromate coating process starts with a redox reaction between the hexavalent chromium and the metal. In the case of aluminum, for example,

Cr^{6+} + Al^{0} → Cr^{3+} + Al^{3+}

The resulting trivalent cations react with hydroxide ions in water to form the corresponding hydroxides, or a solid solution of both hydroxides:

Cr^{3+} + 3 OH^{−} → Cr(OH)_{3}

Al^{3+} + 3 OH^{−} → Al(OH)_{3}

Under appropriate conditions, these hydroxides condense with elimination of water to form a colloidal sol of very small particles, that are deposited as a hydrogel on the metal's surface. The gel consists of a three-dimensional solid skeleton of oxides and hydroxides, with nanoscale elements and voids, enclosing a liquid phase. The structure of the gel depends on metal ion concentration, pH, and other ingredients of the solution, such as chelating agents and counterions.

The gel film contracts as it dries, compressing the skeleton and causing it to stiffen. Eventually shrinkage stops, and further drying leaves the pores open but dry, turning the film into a xerogel. In the case of aluminum, the dry coating comprises mostly chromium(III) oxide Cr_{2}O_{3}, or mixed (III)/(VI) oxide, with very little Al_{2}O_{3}. Typically the process variables are adjusted to give a dry coating that is 200-300 nm thick.

The coating contracts as it dries, which causes it to crack into many microscopic scales, described as "dried mud" pattern. The trapped solution keeps reacting with any metal that gets exposed in the cracks, so that the final coating is continuous and covers the entire surface.

Although the main reactions turn most of the chromium(VI) anions (chromates and dichromates) in the deposited gel into insoluble chromium(III) compounds, a small quantity of them remains un-reacted in the dried-out coating. For example, in the coating formed on aluminum by a commercial bath, about 23% of the chromium atoms were found to be hexavalent Cr^{6+}, except in a region close to the metal. These chromium(VI) residues can migrate when the coating is wetted, and are believed to play a role in preventing corrosion in the finished part—specifically, by restoring the coating in any new microscopic cracks where corrosion could start.

== Substrates ==
=== Zinc ===
Chromating is often performed on galvanized parts to make them more durable. The chromate coating acts as paint does, protecting the zinc from white corrosion, thus making the part considerably more durable, depending on the chromate layer's thickness.

The protective effect of chromate coatings on zinc is indicated by color, progressing from clear/blue to yellow, gold, olive drab and black. Darker coatings generally provide more corrosion resistance. The coating color can also be changed with dyes, so color is not a complete indicator of the process used.

ISO 4520 specifies chromate conversion coatings on electroplated zinc and cadmium coatings. ASTM B633 Type II and III specify zinc plating plus chromate conversion on iron and steel parts. Recent revisions of ASTM B633 defer to ASTM F1941 for zinc plating mechanical fasteners, like bolts, nuts, etc. 2019 is the current revision for ASTM B633 (superseded the revision from 2015), which raised required tensile thresholds when confronting hydrogen embrittlement issues and addressed embrittlement concerns in a new appendix.

=== Aluminium and its alloys ===
For aluminum, the chromate conversion bath can be simply a solution of chromic acid. The process is rapid (1–5 min), requires a single ambient temperature process tank and associated rinse, and is relatively trouble free.

As of 1995, Henkel's Alodine 1200s commercial formula for aluminum consisted of 50-60% chromic anhydride CrO_{3}, 20-30% potassium tetrafluoroborate KBF_{4}, 10-15% potassium ferricyanide K_{3}Fe(CN)_{6}, 5-10% potassium hexafluorozirconate K_{2}ZrF_{6}, and 5-10% sodium fluoride NaF by weight. The formula was meant to be dissolved in water at the concentration of 9.0 g/L, giving a bath with pH = 1.5. It yielded a light gold color after 1 min, and a golden-brown film after 3 min. The average thickness ranged between 200 and 1000 nm.

Iridite 14-2 is a chromate conversion bath for aluminum. Its ingredients include chromium(IV) oxide, barium nitrate, sodium silicofluoride and ferricyanide. In the aluminum industry, the process is also called chemical film or yellow iridite, Commercial trademarked names include Iridite and Bonderite (formerly known as Alodine, or Alocrom in the UK). The main standards for chromate conversion coating of aluminium are MIL-DTL-5541 in the US, and Def Stan 03/18 in the UK.

=== Magnesium ===
Alodine may also refer to chromate-coating magnesium alloys.

=== Steel ===
Steel and iron cannot be chromated directly. Steel plated with zinc or zinc-aluminum alloy may be chromated. Chromating zinc plated steel does not enhance zinc's cathodic protection of the underlying steel from rust.

=== Phosphate coatings ===
Chromate conversion coatings can be applied over the phosphate conversion coatings often used on ferrous substrates. The process is used to enhance the phosphate coating.

== Safety ==
Hexavalent chromium compounds have been the topic of intense workplace and public health concern for their carcinogenicity, and have become highly regulated.

In particular, concerns about the exposure of workers to chromates and dichromates while handling the immersion bath and the wet parts, as well as the small residues of those anions that remain trapped in the coating, have motivated the development of alternative commercial bath formulations that do not contain hexavalent chromium; for instance, by replacing the chromates by trivalent chromium salts, which are considerably less toxic and provide as good or better corrosion resistance than traditional hexavalent chromate conversion.

In Europe, the RoHS and REACH Directives encourage elimination of hexavalent chromium in a broad range of industrial applications and products, including chromate conversion coating processes.
