= Horsehead Corporation =

American producer of zinc and related materials

Horsehead Holding Corporation
- Type: Public
- Traded as: Nasdaq: ZINC
- Founded: 1848; 178 years ago, New Jersey
- Defunct: 2016
- Fate: Chapter 11 bankruptcy
- Headquarters: Pittsburgh, Pennsylvania, U.S.
- Owner: Sun Capital

Horsehead Holding Corporation, formerly The New Jersey Zinc Company, was an American producer of zinc and related materials based in Pittsburgh. The operations of the historic company are currently conducted as American Zinc Recycling.

The New Jersey Zinc Company was for many years the largest producer of zinc and zinc products in the United States. The company thrived in the period from 1897 to 1966, at which time it merged with Gulf and Western Industries. It continued to operate as a subsidiary of Gulf+Western until 1981, when a management-led buyout acquired it under the name of Horsehead Industries. The New Jersey Zinc Company remained a subsidiary of Horsehead Industries until 1987, when Horsehead merged it with St. Joe Minerals a Missouri lead and zinc producer to form Zinc Corporation of America. The company suffered from worldwide record low prices for zinc in the early 2000s and filed for Chapter 11 bankruptcy in 2002. Sun Capital Partners purchased the company's assets in 2003 for $73.6 million and renamed it Horsehead Corporation which currently produces zinc products processed from recycling and steelmaking waste.

Horsehead filed for voluntary Chapter 11 bankruptcy protection on Feb 2, 2016.

== History ==
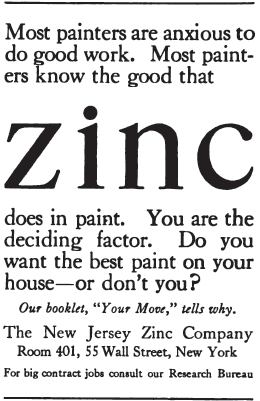
New Jersey Zinc Company advertisement from a 1915 magazine

The company had its origins in northwestern New Jersey in 1848 when two companies were created to exploit the iron and zinc deposits at Franklin and Sterling Hill in Sussex County, New Jersey. The Sussex Zinc and Copper Mining and Manufacturing Corporation was incorporated in 1848 for the purpose of mining zinc, and the New Jersey Exploration and Mining Company was incorporated in 1849 for the purpose of mining iron. The founding partners were the same for both companies, and in 1852 the companies merged to form the New Jersey Zinc Corporation. The company adopted the horsehead, one of the state symbols of New Jersey, as its logo.

Because of ambiguous deeds, overlapping claims, and misunderstanding over the nature of the ores at Franklin and Sterling Hill, mining companies in the district were in constant litigation. From 1868 to 1880, the New Jersey Zinc Company fought a legal battle with Moses Taylor's Franklin Iron Company, a dispute that was finally resolved in 1880 by merging the two companies into the New Jersey Zinc and Iron Company. In 1897, the remaining Franklin District companies were consolidated under the umbrella of the New Jersey Zinc Company, led by Stephen S. Palmer and August Heckscher as general manager. The Palmer family controlled the company for 46 years until the death of Stephen's son Edgar in 1943, when the estate of Edgar Palmer was forced to sell its controlling interest in order to pay inheritance taxes.

In 1966, the company agreed to merge with Gulf and Western Industries and become a subsidiary of that conglomerate. The passage of environmental protection laws in the 1970s turned New Jersey Zinc's legacy of environmental pollution into a liability. In 1981, former officials of Gulf and Western's Natural Resources Division led a buyout of New Jersey Zinc and made it a subsidiary of Horsehead Industries, Inc, a reference to the company's logo adopted in 1852. Saddled with environmental cleanup liabilities, and struggling with cash flow due to record low prices in the early 2000s, Horsehead Industries filed for bankruptcy in 2002.

At its peak, the company owned and operated smelters and mines across the United States and Canada. The sites of the smelters at De Pue, Illinois and Palmerton, Pennsylvania, and the Eagle Mine in Eagle County, Colorado are listed as EPA Superfund sites.

On July 22, 2010, two Horsehead workers were killed at a plant in Monaca, Pennsylvania. An explosion occurred in a refinery column and the workers suffocated due to smoke inhalation.

The 1954 film Salt of the Earth was based on the 1951 strike against New Jersey Zinc Company’s Empire Zinc mine in Bayard, New Mexico.

In February 2016, Horsehead Corporation filed for Chapter 11 protection in the U.S. Court of Bankruptcy in Delaware. Subsequent to the bankruptcy filing many shareholders wrote into the court alleging foul play by Greywolf and other members of the ad-hoc group of noteholders. On May 2, in the US Bankruptcy Court in Delaware, Judge Sontchi entered an order for the formation of an official committee of equity holders, declaring, "Something Smells fishy to the court".

Shareholders in Horsehead included Mohnish Pabrai, Matthew Peterson, Phil Town and Guy Spier

Horsehead emerged from bankruptcy in September 2016 as a private company owned by Greywolf Capital Management, and renamed "American Zinc Recycling". As of August 2018, American Zinc Recycling operates six facilities: a state-of-the-art solvent-extraction and electrowinning plant in Mooresboro, NC; a zinc powder facility in Palmerton, Pennsylvania; and four recycling facilities located in Barnwell, South Carolina, Calumet, Illinois, Rockwood, Tennessee, and Palmerton, Pennsylvania.

On April 28, 2019, a fire started at the company's zinc production plant in Mooresboro which forced some residents in the area to evacuate. None of the company's employees were injured and all were accounted for.

== See also ==
- Zinc refining
- Zamak
