= Phosphate conversion coating =

Technique of protection of steel surfaces against corrosion

Phosphate conversion coating is a chemical treatment applied to steel parts that creates a thin adhering layer of iron, zinc, or manganese phosphates to improve corrosion resistance or lubrication or as a foundation for subsequent coatings or painting. It is one of the most common types of conversion coating. The process is also called phosphate coating, phosphatization, phosphatizing, or phosphating. It is also known by the trade term Parkerizing, especially when applied to firearms and other military equipment.

A phosphate coating is usually obtained by applying to the steel part a dilute solution of phosphoric acid, possibly with soluble iron, zinc, and/or manganese salts. The solution may be applied by sponging, spraying, or immersion. Phosphate conversion coatings can also be used on aluminium, zinc, cadmium, silver and tin.

== History ==
The phosphatizing of firearms was discovered around 1910, when it was found that the surface of steel, if changed to a phosphate, acquires significant corrosion resistance. Until the 1940s it was very popular in the USA until more modern but similar methods of metal finishes were introduced.

== Types ==
The main types of phosphate coatings are manganese, iron, and zinc.

- Manganese phosphate coatings are used both for corrosion resistance and lubricity and are applied only by immersion.
- Iron phosphate coatings are typically used as a base for further coatings or painting and are applied by immersion or by spraying.
- Zinc phosphate coatings are used for corrosion resistance, as a lubricant-holding layer, and as a paint/coating base and can also be applied by immersion or spraying. They can also be applied to galvanized steel.

== Process ==
The process takes advantage of the low solubility of phosphates at medium or high pH. The bath is a solution of phosphoric acid (H_{3}PO_{4}), containing the desired iron, zinc or manganese cations and other additives. The acid reacts with the iron metal producing hydrogen and iron cations:

Fe + 2 H_{3}O^{+} → Fe^{2+} + H_{2} + 2 H_{2}O

The reaction consuming protons raises the pH of the solution in the immediate vicinity of the surface, until eventually the phosphates become insoluble and get deposited over it. The acid and metal reaction also creates iron phosphate locally which may also be deposited. When depositing zinc phosphate or manganese phosphate the additional iron phosphate may be an undesired impurity.

The bath often includes an oxidizer, such as sodium nitrite (NaNO_{2}), to consume the hydrogen gas (H_{2}) — which otherwise would form a layer of tiny bubbles over the surface, slowing down the reaction.

The main phosphating step can be preceded by an "activation" bath that creates tiny particles of titanium compounds on the surface.

The performance of a phosphate coating depends on its crystal structure as well as its thickness. A dense microcrystalline structure with a low porosity is usually best for corrosion resistance or subsequent painting. A coarse grain structure impregnated with oil may be best for wear resistance. These factors can be controlled by varying the bath concentration, composition, temperature, and time.

== Parkerizing ==
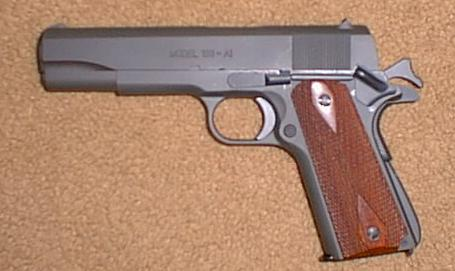
A zinc-Parkerized civilian .45 ACP Springfield Armory, Inc. M1911-A1 pistol

Parkerizing is a method of protecting a steel surface from corrosion and increasing its resistance to wear through the application of a chemical phosphate conversion coating. It was usually applied to firearms. Parkerizing is usually considered to be an improved zinc or manganese phosphating process, not an improved iron phosphating process, although some use the term parkerizing as a generic term for applying phosphating (or phosphatizing) coatings that do include the iron phosphating process.

Bonderizing, phosphating, and phosphatizing are other terms associated with the Parkerizing process but were often used for finishes of car parts as it gave finer grain on the surface. It has also been known as pickling in the context of wrought iron and steel.

Parkerizing is commonly used on firearms as a more effective alternative to bluing, which is an earlier-developed chemical conversion coating. It is also used extensively on automobiles to protect unfinished metal parts from corrosion.

The Parkerizing process cannot be used to protect non-ferrous metals such as aluminium, brass, or copper but can be used for chemical polishing or etching instead. It similarly cannot be applied to steels containing a large amount of nickel, or on stainless steel. Passivation can be used for protecting other metals.

=== Early history ===
Development of the process was started in Britain and continued by the Parker family in the United States. The terms Parkerizing, Parkerize, and Parkerized are all registered U.S. trademarks of Henkel Adhesives Technologies, although the terminology has largely passed into generic use for many years. The process was first used on a large scale in the manufacture of firearms for the United States military during World War II.

The earliest work on phosphating processes was developed by British inventors William Alexander Ross, British patent 3119, in 1869, and by Thomas Watts Coslett, British patent 8667, in 1906. Coslett, of Birmingham, England, subsequently filed a patent based on this same process in America in 1907, which was granted U.S. patent 870,937 in 1907. It essentially provided an iron phosphating process, using phosphoric acid.

An improved patent application for manganese phosphating based in large part on this early British iron phosphating process was filed in the US in 1912, and issued in 1913 to Frank Rupert Granville Richards as U.S. patent 1,069,903.

Clark W. Parker acquired the rights to Coslett's and Richards' U.S. patents, and experimented in the family kitchen with these and other rust-resisting formulations. The ultimate result was that Parker, along with his son Wyman C. Parker, working together, set up the Parker Rust-Proof Phosphating Company of America in 1915.

R. D. Colquhoun of the Parker Rust-Proof Phosphating Company of America then filed another improved phosphating patent application in 1919. This patent was issued in 1919 as U.S. patent 1,311,319, for an improved manganese phosphating (Parkerizing) technique.

Similarly, Baker and Dingman of the Parker Rust-Proof Company filed an improved manganese phosphating (Parkerizing) process patent in 1928 that reduced the processing time to one-third of the original time that had been required through heating the solution to a temperature in the precisely controlled range of 500 to 550 °F (260 to 288 °C). This patent was issued as U.S. patent 1,761,186 in 1930.

Manganese phosphating, even with these process improvements, still required the use of expensive and difficult-to-obtain manganese compounds. Subsequently, an alternative technique was developed by the Parker Company to use easier-to-obtain compounds at less expense through using zinc phosphating in place of manganese phosphating. The patent for this zinc phosphating process (using strategic compounds that would remain available in America during a war) was granted to inventor Romig of the American Chemical Paint Company in 1938 as U.S. patent 2,132,883, just prior to the loss of easy access to manganese compounds that occurred during World War II.

Somewhat analogous to the improved manganese phosphating process improvements discovered by Baker and Dingman, a similarly improved method was found for an improved zinc phosphating process as well. This improvement was discovered by Darsey of the Parker Rust Proof Company, who filed a patent in February 1941, which was granted in August 1942, U.S. patent 2,293,716, that improved upon the zinc phosphatizing (Parkerizing) process further. He discovered that adding copper reduced the acidity requirement over what had been required, and that also adding a chlorate to the nitrates that were already used would additionally permit running the process at a much lower temperature in the range of 115 to 130 °F (46 to 54 °C), reducing the cost of running the process further. With these process improvements, the end result was that a low-temperature (energy-efficient) zinc phosphating (Parkerizing) process, using strategic materials to which the United States had ready access, became the most common phosphating process used during World War II to protect American war materials such as firearms and planes from rust and corrosion.

=== Later developments ===
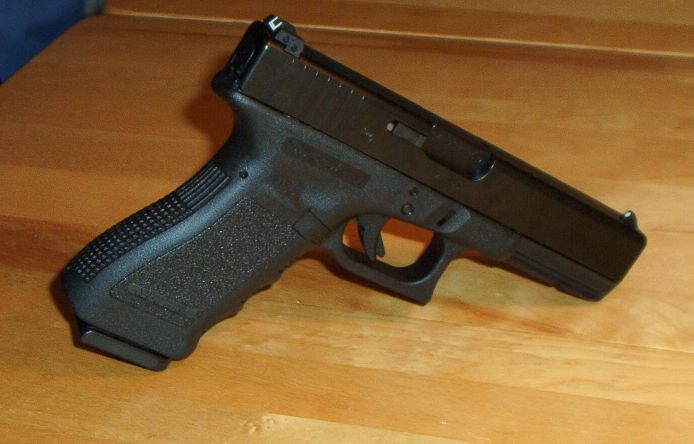
Glock 17 pistol with a black Parkerized topcoat

Glock GmbH, an Austrian firearms manufacturer, uses a black Parkerizing process as a topcoat to a Tenifer (ferritic nitrocarburizing) process to protect the slides of the pistols they manufacture. After applying the Tenifer process, a black Parkerized finish is applied and the slide is protected even if the Parkerized finish were to wear off. Used this way, Parkerizing is thus becoming a protective and decorative finishing technique that is used over other underlying improved techniques of metal protection.

Various of similar recipes for stovetop kitchen Parkerizing circulate in gun publications at times, and Parkerizing kits are sold by major gun-parts distributors such as Brownells.

== Uses ==
=== Painting primer ===
Phosphate coatings are also commonly used as an effective surface preparation for further coating and/or painting, providing excellent adhesion and electric isolation.

=== Corrosion resistance ===
Phosphate coatings are often used to protect steel parts against rusting and other types of corrosion. However, they are somewhat porous, so this use requires impregnating the coating with oil, paint, or some other sealing substance. The result is a tightly adhering dielectric (electrically insulating) layer that can protect the part from electrochemical and under-paint corrosion.

=== Wear resistance ===
Zinc and manganese coatings are used to help break in components subject to wear and help prevent galling.

=== Lubrication ===
While a zinc phosphate coating by itself is somewhat abrasive, it can be turned into a lubricating layer for cold forming operations by treatment with sodium stearate (soap). The soap reacts with the phosphate crystals forming a very thin insoluble and hydrophobic zinc stearate layer, that helps to hold the unreacted sodium stearate even under extreme deformation of the part, such as in wire drawing.

== See also ==
- Chromate conversion coating
- Hot-dip galvanization
- Iron pillar of Delhi
- Jewelling
- Manganese(II) phosphate
- Powder coating

== Sources ==
- MIL-HDBK-205, Phosphate & Black Oxide Coating of Ferrous Metals: a standard overview on phosphate and black oxide (bluing) coatings
- Budinski, Kenneth G. (1988), Surface Engineering for Wear Resistance, Englewood Cliffs, New Jersey: Prentice Hall, p. 48
- Brimi, Marjorie A. (1965), Electrofinishing, New York, New York: American Elsevier Publishing Company, Inc., pp. 62–63.
