= Chemical coloring of metals =

Process of changing the color of metal surfaces with different chemical solutions

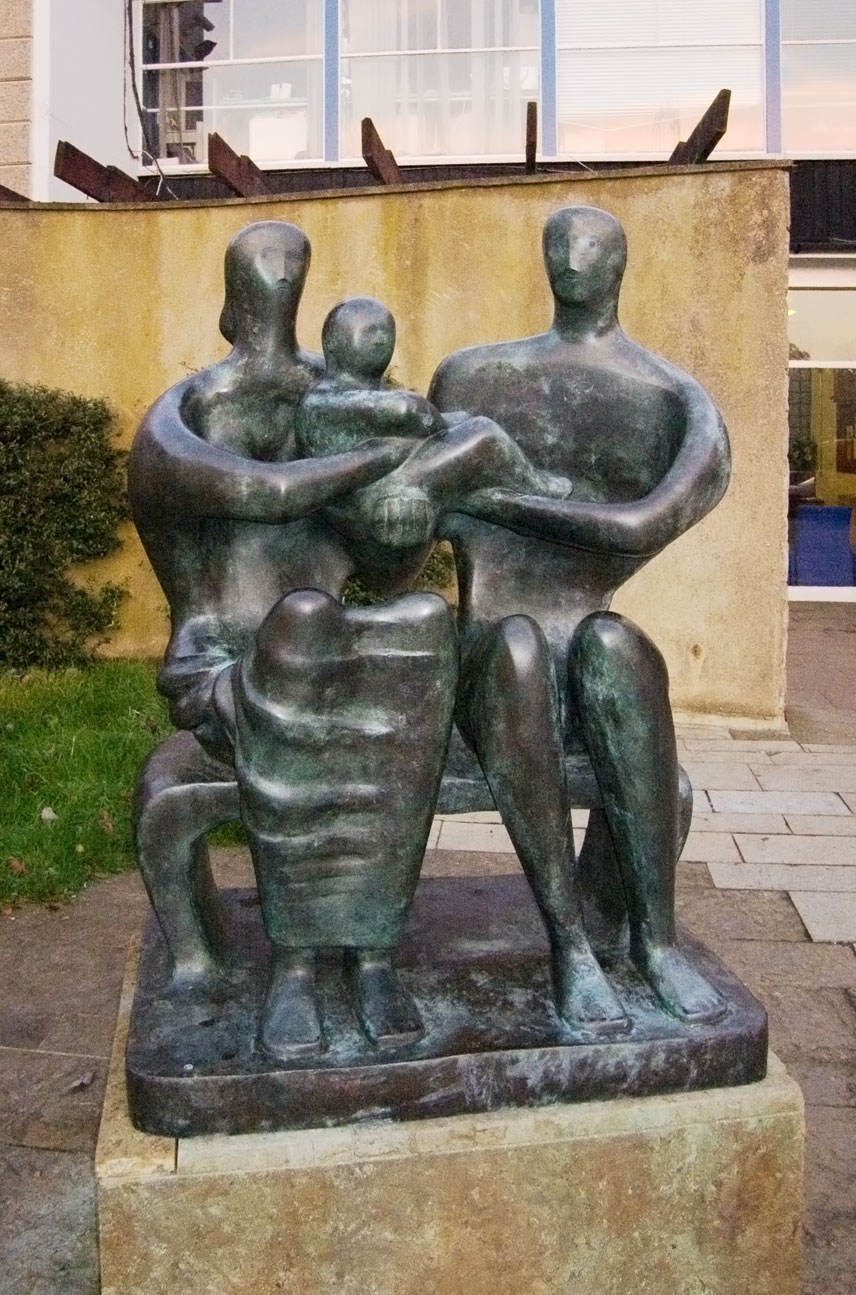
Henry Moore, Family Group (1950), patinated bronze

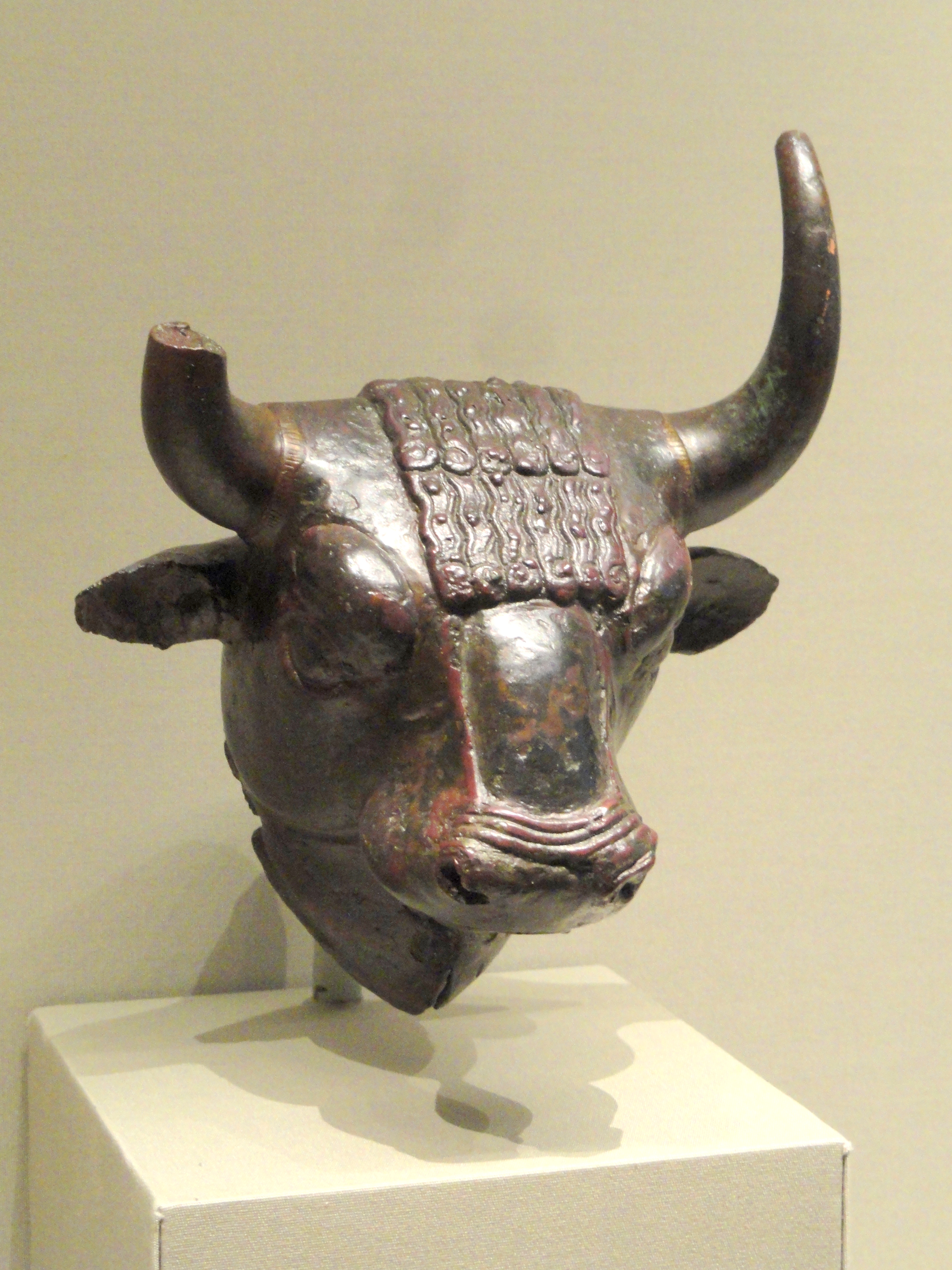
Bull Head Attachment, about 700-600 BCE, Urartian, northwest Iran, bronze – Cleveland Museum of Art, early example of metal coloring

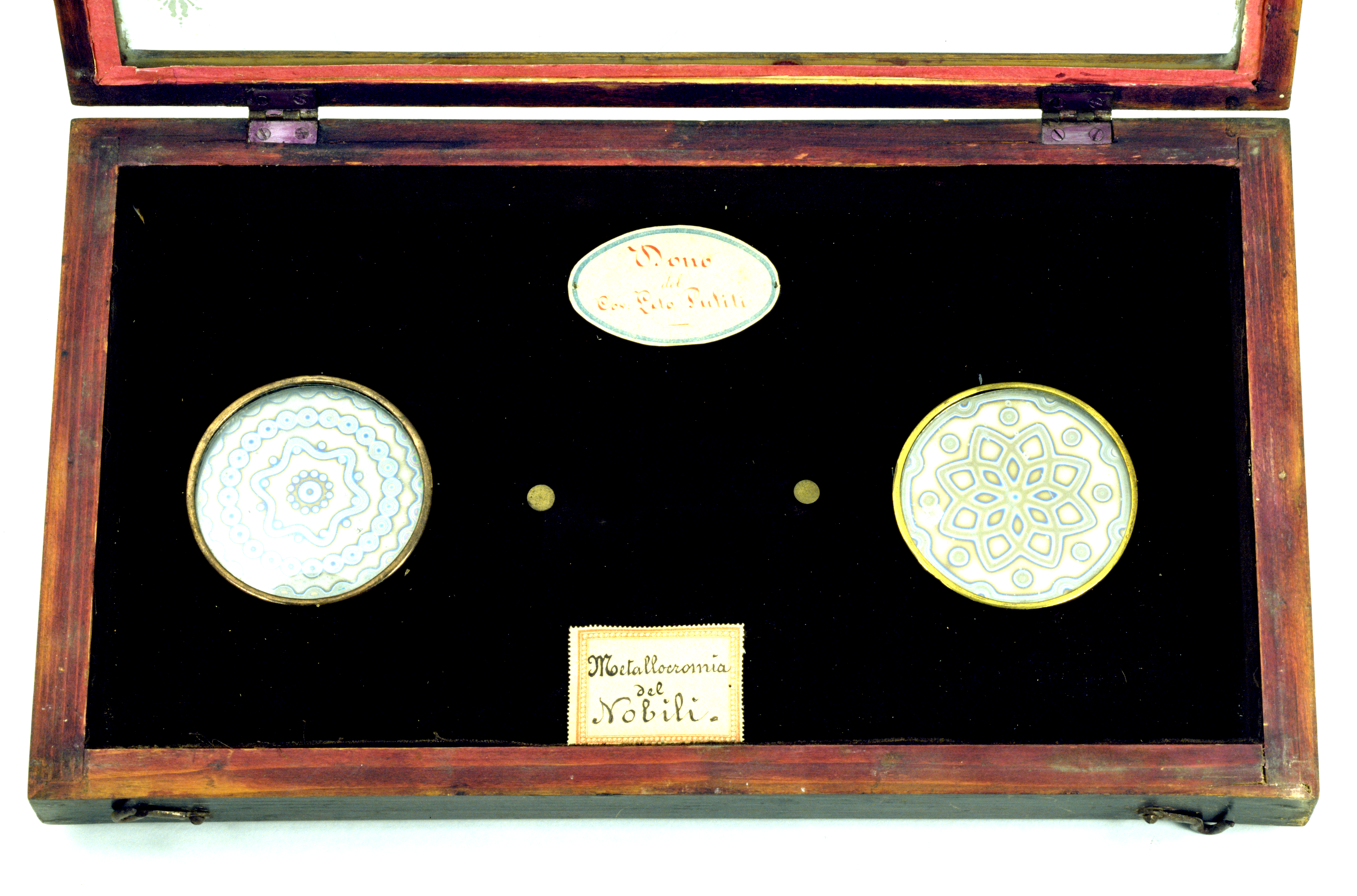
Metallocromia – Nobilis colored rings, Museo Galileo; Florence

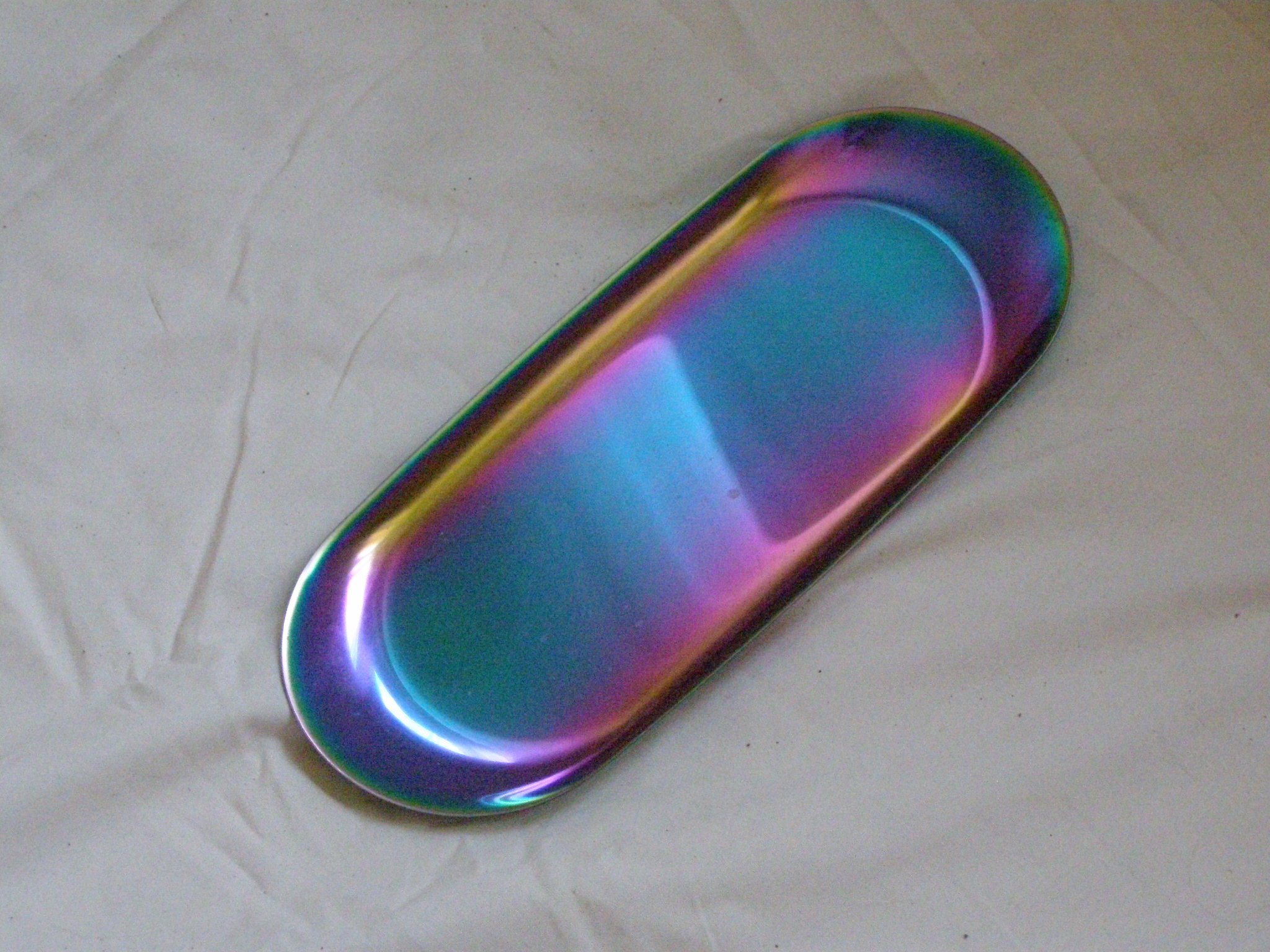
PVD colored stainless steel tray

The chemical coloring of metals involve processes that change the color of metal surfaces with different chemical solutions. These processes can be categorized into four types:

- Electroplating – coating the metal surface with another metal using electrolysis.
- Patination – chemically reacting the metal surface to form a colored oxide or salt.
- Anodizing – electrolytic passivation process used to increase the thickness of the natural oxide layer, producing a porous surface that can accept organic or inorganic dyes easily. In the case of titanium, niobium, and stainless steel, the color formed depends on the thickness of the oxide (which is determined by the anodizing voltage).
- Physical vapor deposition (PVD) – coating the surface with a thin film of vaporized material. This is the best method for coloring stainless steel, for the color produced is much more durable than those via other processes.

Chemically coloring a metal is distinct from simply coating it via a method such as gilding or mercury silvering, since chemical coloring involves a chemical reaction, whereas simple coating does not.

Modern possibilities of using laser to patinate copper and of using microscopic fungi to patinate copper and iron are also being researched.

== History ==
The process of chemically coloring metal is as old as metalworking technology. Some of the earliest-known examples of colored metal objects are about 5,000 years old. They are bronze casts with some silver-colored parts, which originate from the Anatolian region. Similar processes can be found on some ancient Egyptian copper sheets. Another example of early chemical coloring of metals is the Nebra sky disc, which has a green patina and gold inlays. An early example of black colored iron is a Celtic spearhead found in the River Thames dated between 200 and 50 BC.

Pliny the Elder mentioned liver of sulfur and the distinction between naturally occurring and artificial patina in the first century CE. Another ancient document about the chemical coloring of metals is the Leyden papyrus X (3rd century CE). Zosimos of Panopolis, a Greek-Egyptian alchemist who lived in the late 3rd and early 4th centuries is attributed with some of the oldest written recipes for chemical coloring of metals.

Two important sources from the Middle Ages on chemically colored metals are the Mappae clavicula (between 9th – 12th century CE) and Theophilus Presbyter's work De Diversis Artibus (12th century CE).

At the time of the Renaissance, the most significant documents were the Treatise on Goldsmithing and the Treatise on Sculpture by Italian mannerist, sculptor, and goldsmith Benvenuto Cellini. Patination is briefly mentioned by Italian painter and writer Giorgio Vasari and by Pomponius Gauricus in his work De Sculptura in 1504. André Felibien mentions techniques for patination of bronze sculptures in his work Principes in 1699.

The beginning of modern science-based chemical or electrochemical coloring of metals is marked by Leopoldo Nobili's (1784–1835) discovery of Nobilis colored rings in 1826. Leonhard Elsner, Alexander Watt, Antoine César Becquerel (1788–1878) and Rudolf Christian Böttger (1806–1881) are also important people in the early history of electrochemical coloring of metals. George Richards Elkington (1801–1865) patented a process for electroplating silver and gold in 1840, which was further refined by J.E. Stareck in 1937. In the 19th century, the first manuals dedicated exclusively to the chemical coloring of metals were published.

In 1868, Puscher reported on the application of multicolored or lustre patina based on sodium thiosulphate and lead acetate for the first time (contemporary recipes for this patina use copper compounds instead of lead).

Great progress was made in the industrial application of chemical coloring of metals in the early 20th century. 1904 saw the first use of selenium-based black and multicolor patinas for steel, copper and brass. Around 1905, the first patents for black nickel (German patents DRP 183972 and DRP 201663) and black oxide (circa 1915–1922, German patents DRP 292603, DRP 357198, DRP 368548) were made. Between 1923 and 1928, the first UK patents relating to oxidized aluminium were published, and black chromium was developed in 1929 (German patent GP 607, 420).

After the Second World War, there was a growing interest in green patinated copper sheets, which were intended primarily for architectural use. Technologies for anodic oxidation of titanium, and later niobium and tantalum, have evolved since the mid-1960s. Technology for coloring stainless steel via anodic oxidation was developed in 1957.

Now, the possibilities of using bacterial cultures in the patination of copper and iron are being investigated, and laser-induced staining of copper and its alloys, niobium, titanium, stainless steel, and chromium plated objects, are being tested.

== Uses ==
Chemical coloring of metals is primarily used in the manufacture of sculptures, jewelry, badges, medals, clocks, watches and decorations. It is also used in architecture, metallography, in the manufacture of metal furniture, and for military purposes as well as decorative vessels. It is used in the restoration and conservation of metals to some extent.

== Examples ==
=== Silver (Ag) ===
- Black: Items are immersed in a 2.5% solution of potassium or ammonium or calcium or sodium sulfide.
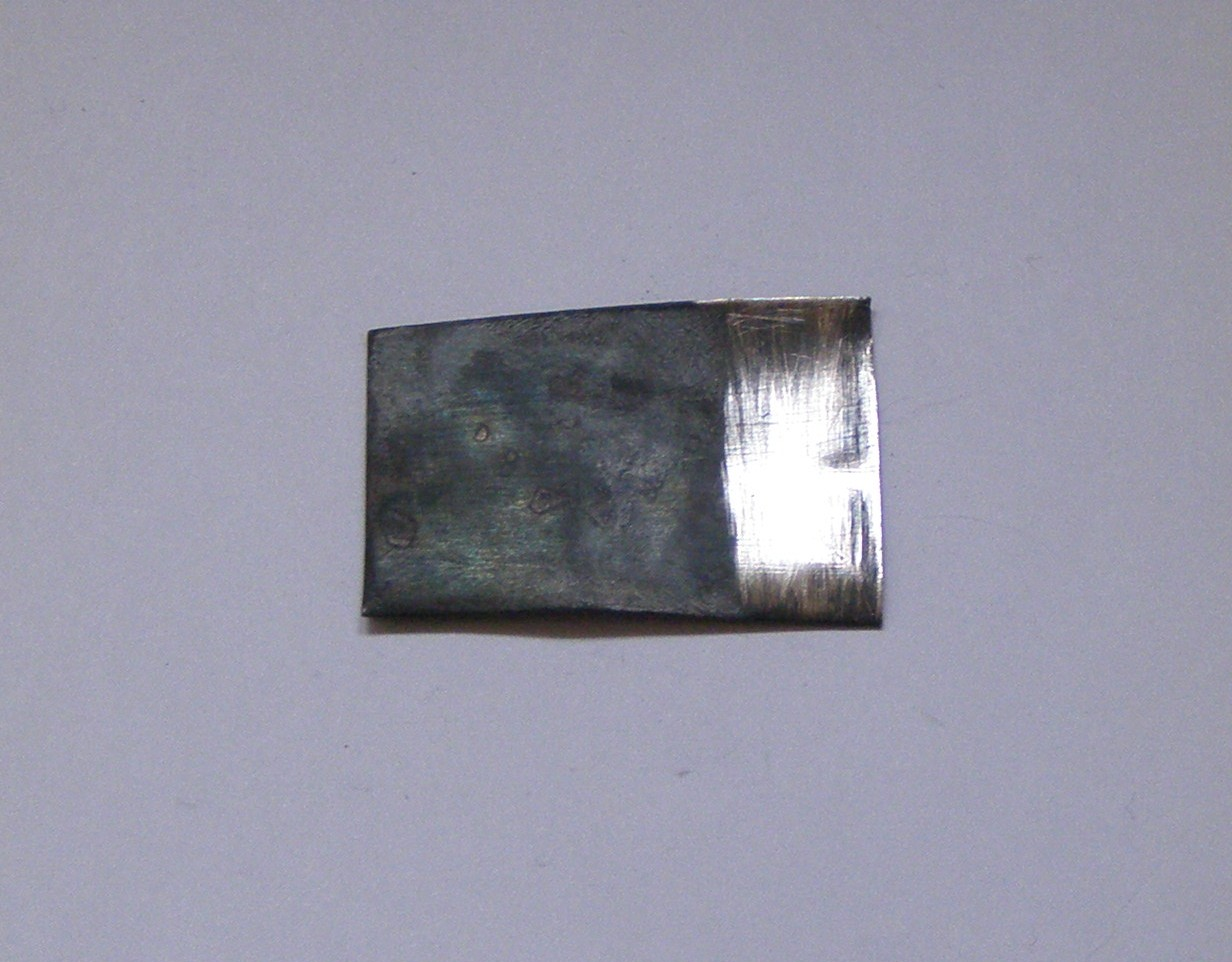
  silver blackened with Na_{2}S solution

=== Copper (Cu) ===
- Green: Objects are coated with a solution of 250 grams of ammonium carbonate / 250 grams of ammonium chloride / 1 litre of water, each layer is dried for 24 hours. If the amount of chlorides decreases, the color will be more bluish-green, if carbonate decreases, more yellow.
- Black: Items are submerged in a 2.5% solution of sodium polysulfide
- Brown: Items are boiled in at least 3-day-old water solution of 12% copper sulfate.

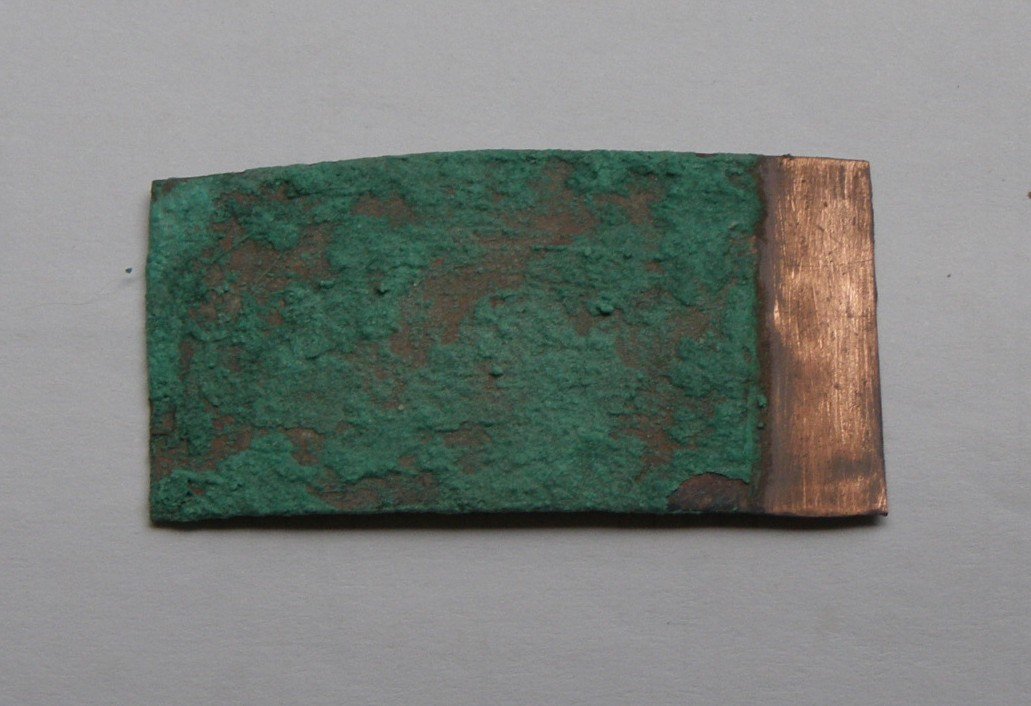
Green patina on copper, test plate

=== Iron (Fe) ===
- Black: Object is coated in linseed oil and heated to 300–400 °C. This process can be used many metals, excepting those with low melting points (e.g., lead, tin).
- Brown: Item is coated in a 5% aqueous solution of ferric chloride and later abraded.

=== Titanium (Ti) ===
- Object is immersed in a 3% solution of trisodium phosphate, with color depending on voltage.

=== Stainless Steel ===
- Object is immersed in a solution of sodium dichromate and sulfuric acid, with color depending on duration of immersion. As hexavalent chromium compounds are prohibited for use in the EU based on ROHS regulations and are toxic and carcinogenic, solutions based on molybdate or tungstate are proposed as a replacement (e.g. molybdate 30-100g/ boric acid 10-18 g/manganese sulfate 0.5 - 5 g/1 liter of water, 0.1 - 20 A/dm2, 0.1–15 minutes).

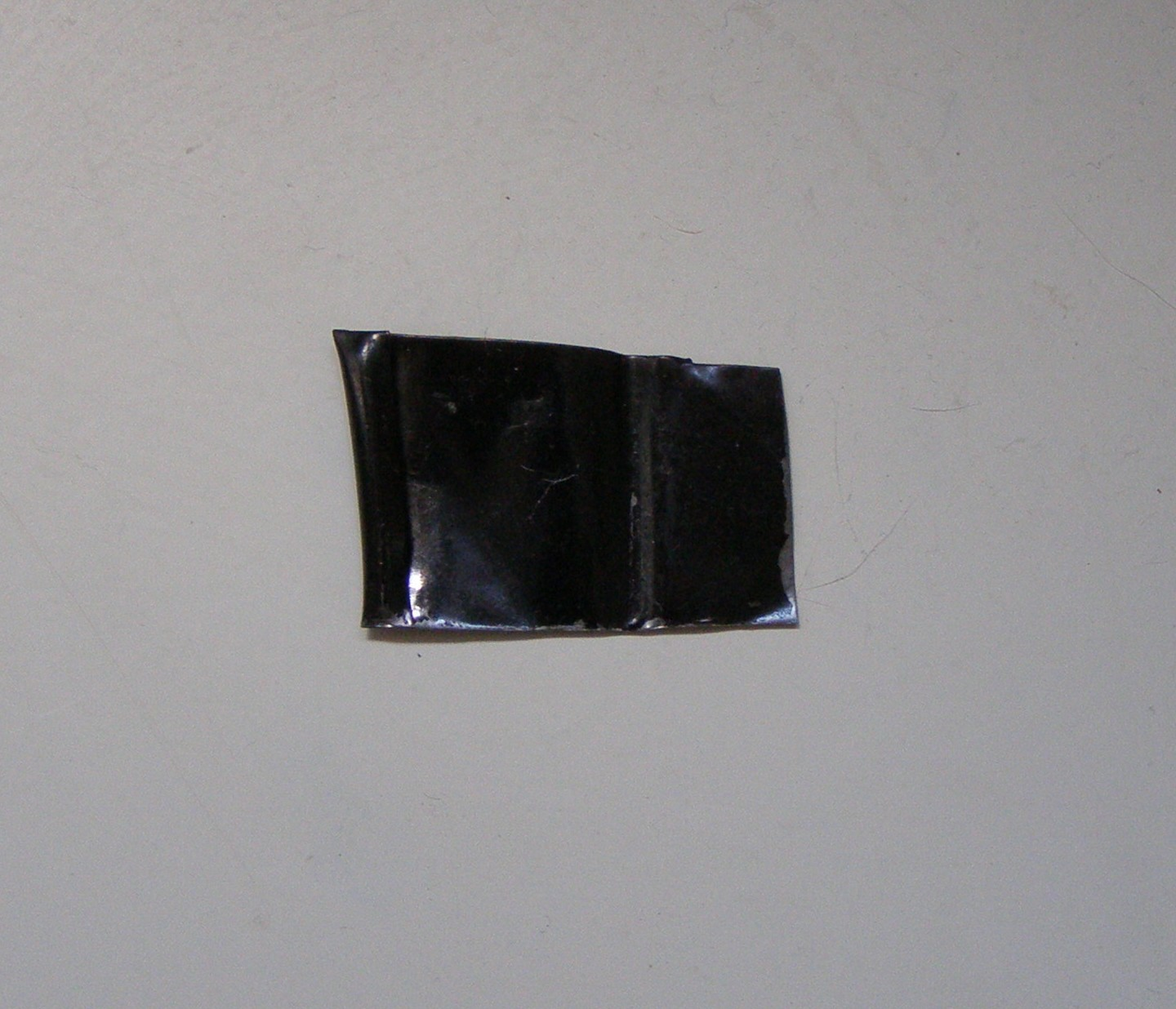
Blackened steel test plate, oiled with linseed oil and then heated to 300 - 400 C

=== Other Metals ===
- Gray for tin or pewter: Object is immersed in 20% aqueous solution of ferric chloride.
- Gray-black for zinc: Object is immersed in 20% aqueous solution of ferric chloride.
- Black for aluminum: Object is immersed in a boiling solution of 20 g/L ammonium molybdate and 5 g/L of sodium thiosulfate.

=== Lustre colours ===
- Copper, Silver, Nickel, Iron, Gold: Object is immersed in a solution of 280 g sodium thiosulphate, 25 g cupric acetate, and 30 g citric acid.
- Tin, Pewter: Object is immersed in solution of 250 g/L sodium thiosulphate, 60 g/L copper acetate, 25 milliliter acetone at 45-85 °C. g
- Stainless steel: 100 g/L sodium thiosulphate, 10 g/L lead acetate, 12 g/L potassium sodium tartrate, 12 g/L copper sulfate at 18-22 °C.

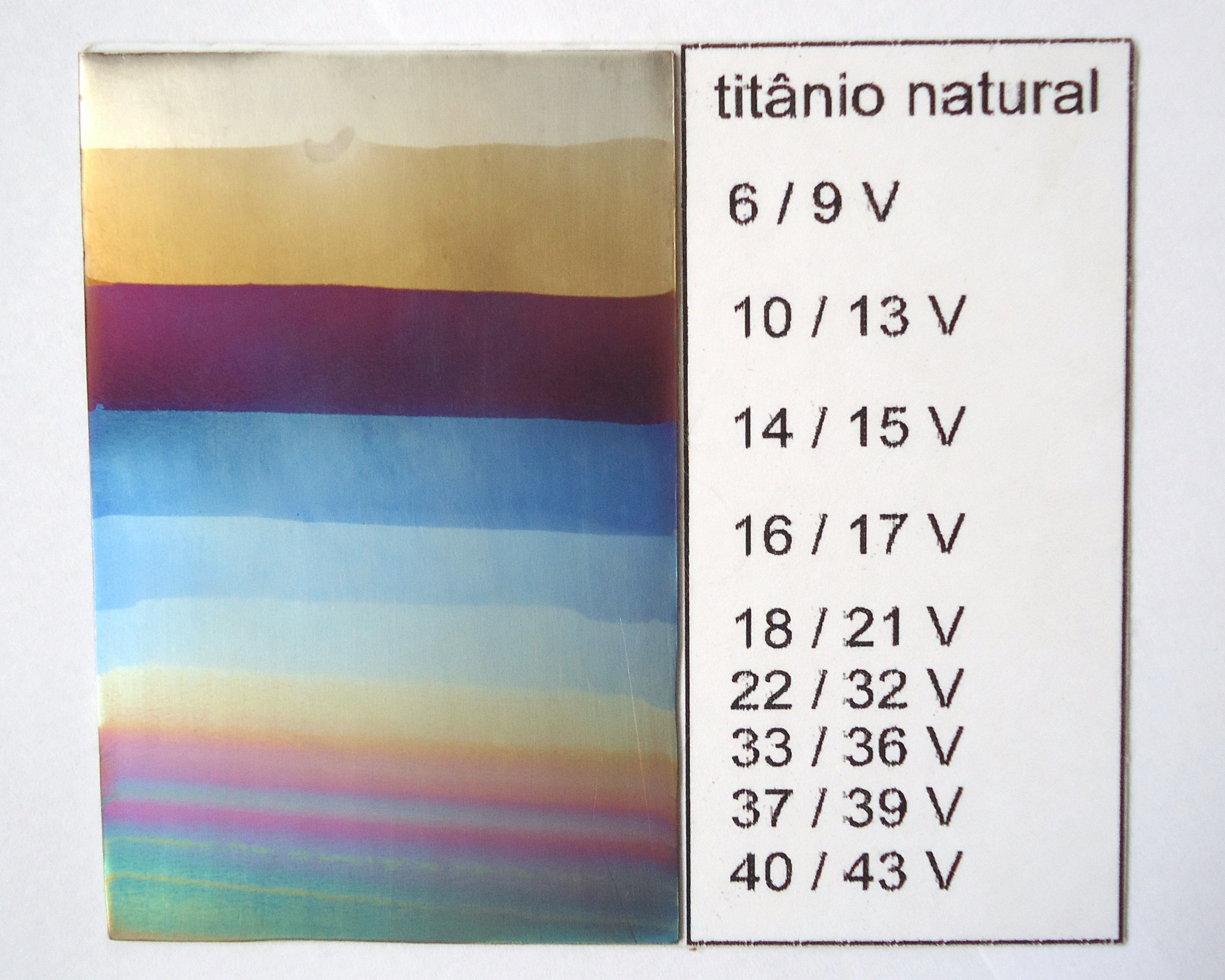
Various colors on titanium (anodic oxidation)

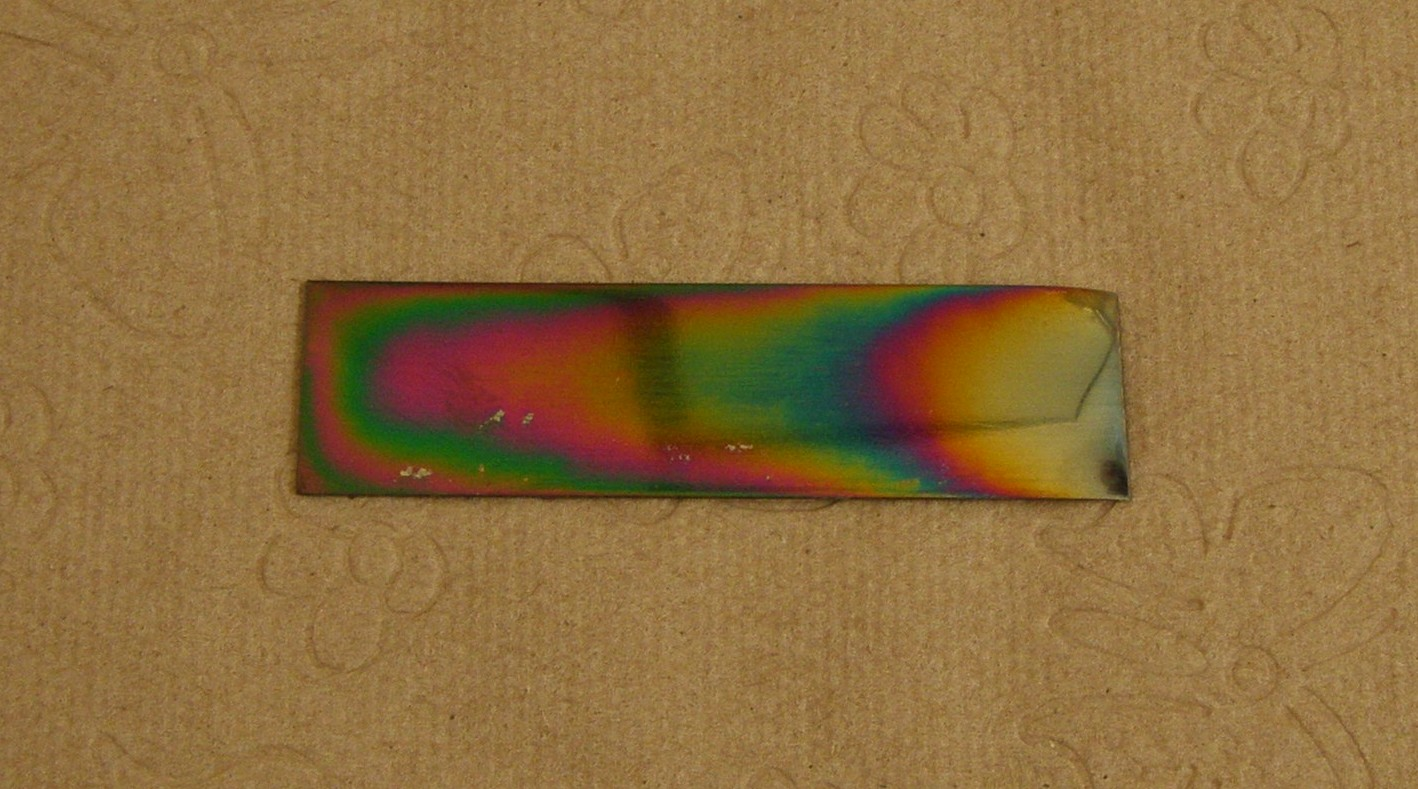
anodized stainless steel test plate (molybdate based solution - can be used on pewter too)

== See also ==
- Electrochemical coloring of metals
- Heat coloring of metals
- Black oxide
- Bluing (steel)
- Anodizing

== Literature ==
Hiorns, A. (1907). Metal Colouring and Bronzing. London: Macmillan and Co. OCLC 3757279.

Kaup, W. J. (1914). Metal Coloring and Finishing. New York City: Industrial Press.

Field, S. (1925). The Chemical Coloring of Metals and Allied Processes. London: Chapman & Hall, Ltd. OCLC 2922065.

Fishlock, D. (1962). Metal Colouring. Teddington: R. Draper. OCLC 3982659.

Hughes, R.; Rowe, M. (1991). The Colouring, Bronzing and Patination of Metals (3rd ed.). London: Thames and Hudson. ISBN 9780500015018. OCLC 24734412.

LaNiece, S.; Craddock, P. (1993). Metal Plating and Patination: Cultural, Technical and Historical Developments. Oxford: Butterworth-Heinemann. ISBN 9780750616119. OCLC 27336439.

Young, R.D. (2000). Contemporary Patination (5th ed.). Escondido: Sculpt-Nouveau. ISBN 9780960374410.

Kipper, P. (2003). Pátinas for Silicon Bronze (2nd ed.). Loveland: Path Publications. ISBN 9780964726901. OCLC 930605479.

Sugimori, E. (2004). Japanese Patinas. Portland: Brynmorgen Press. ISBN 9781929565115. OCLC 62859653.

Runfola, M. (2014). Patina : 300+ Coloration Effects for Jewelers & Metalsmiths. Loveland: Interveave Press. ISBN 9781620331392. OCLC 871436497.
