= Ebonol =

Ebonol may refer to:

- Ebonol (material), a synthetic material similar to an ebony wood
- Ebonol C, a black oxide process for copper and copper alloys
- Ebonol Z, a black oxide process for zinc and zinc alloys
