= Electrochemical coloring of metals =

Electrochemical process

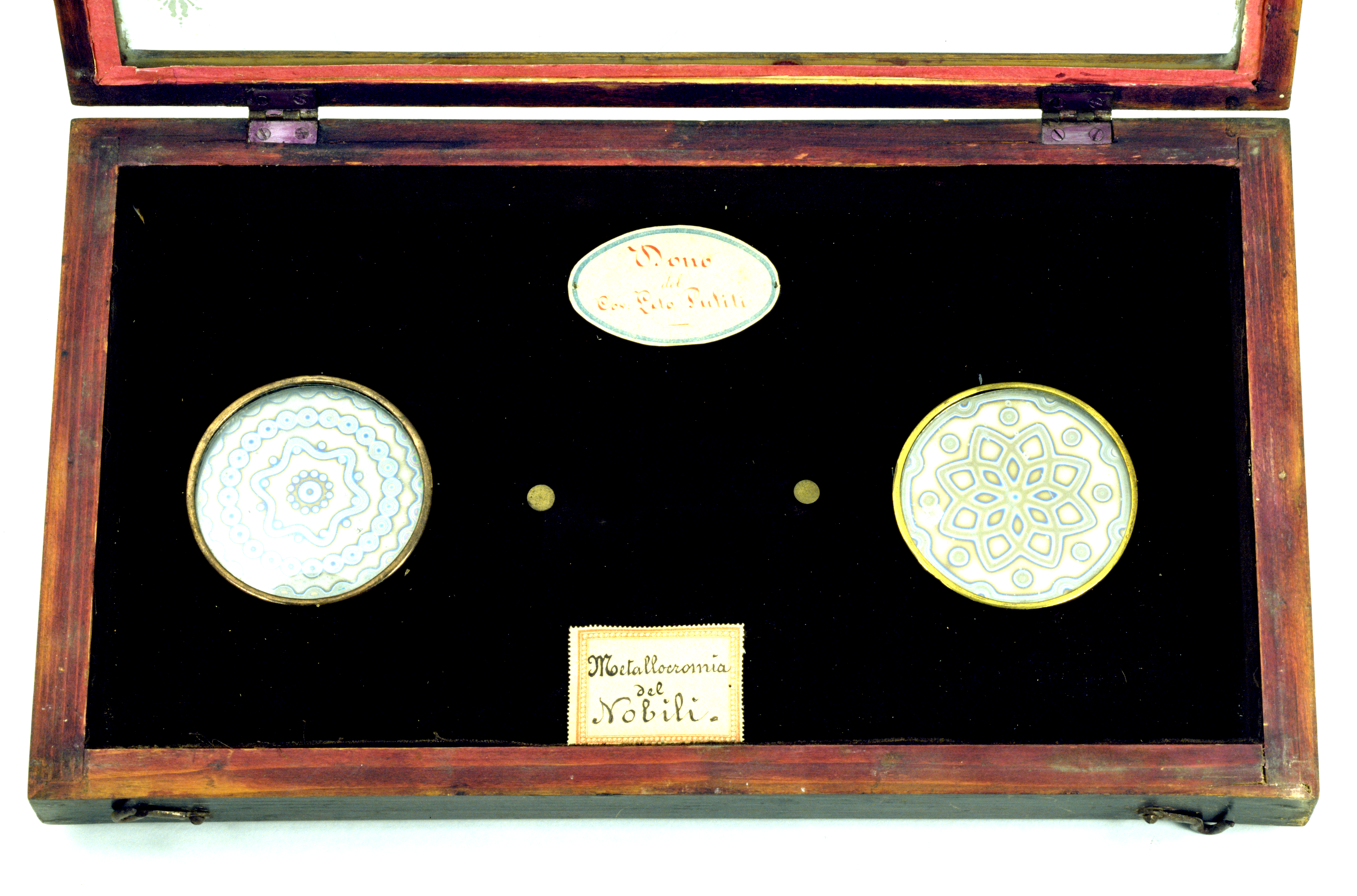
Nobilis colored rings, Museo Galileo, Florence, Italy

Electrochemical coloring of metals is a process in which the surface color of metal is changed by electrochemical techniques, i.e. cathodic or anodic polarization. The first method of electrochemical coloring of metals are certainly Nobili's colored rings, discovered by Leopoldo Nobili, an Italian physicist in 1826. In addition to the multicolored coatings mentioned, he has also been able to obtain monochrome coatings, and he called that technique metallocromia. Electrochemical coloring of metals based processes are black, green and blue nickel plating, black chromium plating, black rhodium plating and black ruthenium plating. Anodic oxidation of aluminum, copper and copper alloys, magnesium, zinc, titanium, niobium, tantalum, steel and stainless steel are also electrochemical colouring processes. Multi-colored and green electrolytic patinas for copper and its alloys are also significant.

== History ==
Apart from Leopoldo Nobili, who already in 1824 performed his first experiments related to the appearance of Nobili's rings, Leonhard Elsner, Alexander Watt, Antoine César Becquerel (1788–1878) and Rudolf Christian Böttger (1806–1881) also dealt with the electrochemical coloring of metals in that early period. It should also be mentioned that in 1768. Joseph Priestley (1733–1804) recorded similar phemomen and that the described phenomenon was called Priestley's or fairy rings, but Priestley used a Leiden bottle and a metal spike, and the rings were formed on a metal plate concentrically around the point of an explosive electrical discharge. We also know that George Richards Elkington (1801–1865), otherwise known for his patent for galvanic gilding and silver plating from 1840 patented at least one process of electrochemical coloring of metals ( the American J.E. Stareck developed and patented ten variants of his process around 1937). A.O.Mathey published the first known article on industrial application of electrochemical coloring of metals 1856.

At the end of the 19th century, A.Lismann (DRP. 93543 / 1898 ) and at the beginning of the 20th century, Setlik developed the first electrolytic processes for green patina on copper ( 1903.), these processes was further developed between the 2 world wars and again after the World War II.

Around the same time, the first procedures for electrolytic browning and blackening of steel were developed (A.de Meriteurs patent D.R.P. 375 961/1886., A.E. and A.G. Haswell patents DRP 56720 and 54847 / 1889., H.L. Hollis' patent USPT 621,084 from 1899 was the first attempts in this direction, but Becquerel reported on that already in 1843! ). While the aforementioned deal with this issue primarily for protection against corrosion, the English patent 106,774 from 1916 and the American patent by T. Rondelli and Q. Sestini USPT 1,386,076 from 1921 are also oriented towards the chemical coloring of steel, and iron as the goal of the procedure.

Black nickel plating was developed around 1905, and between the two wars, black chrome plating (first German patent 1929.GP 607, 420), which saw wider use only from the mid-1950s. After the First World War, the first procedures for anodic oxidation and coloring of anodically oxidized aluminium were developed (1923, 1924.DRP. 413876). In the 1960s, procedures were developed for the anodic oxidation of titanium, a little later niobium and tantalum, and a little bit earlier stainless steel (circa 1957 patent US 2957812 A). Unlike anodically oxidized aluminum, these procedures do not involve an oxide layer that can be colored with special dyes, but interference colors .

Several significant procedures were also developed in the former Soviet Union after the Second World War, the Ukrainian A.P. Eitchis developed several complex, but also original procedures, which included the electrochemical coloring of metals (Kristalit, Iskrit, Sloit, Texturit - His work was strongly influenced by already mentioned J.E.Stareck). Chrome agate and chrome oxide processes were developed in the USSR, they were special versions of black chrome plating.

== Basic division of electrochemically obtained colored coatings ==
=== Coatings formed by deposition on the cathode ===
Black nickel plating, blue nickel plating, green nickel plating, black chrome, chrome agate, chrome oxide, black molybdenum, black manganese, black zinc, black platinum, black palladium, black rhodium, blue rhodium, red rhodium, black ruthenium, Elkington solution, Electrocolor process, Bancroft's Blue. Among the coatings that are no longer used due to their toxicity and European ROHS regulations, we can mention coatings based on arsenic (the so-called shiny gray oxide) and lead .

=== Coatings formed on the anode ===
Nobili rings, Lismann green for copper and alloys, anodic oxidation of aluminum, magnesium, titanium, niobium, tantalum, tungsten, carbon steel and stainless steel, silver, copper and its alloys, tin, chromium and zinc.

== A brief description of several processes ==
=== 1. Nobilis colored rings ===
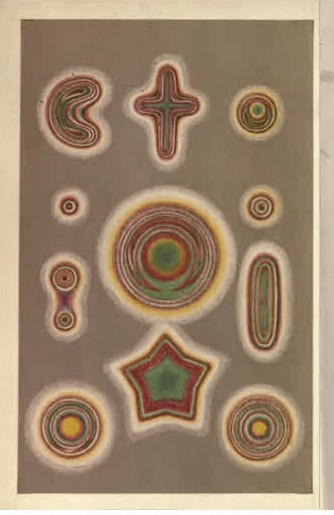
Nobilis rings, picture from book A.Watt – Electro-deposition : a practical treatise on the electrolysis of gold, silver, copper, nickel, and other metals, and alloys, with descriptions of voltaic batteries, magneto and dynamo-electric machines, thermopiles, and of the materials and processes used in every department of the art and several chapters on electrometallurgy, London 1887.

39 gr of lead acetate

100 ml of distilled water

cathode made of platinum or stainless steel (needle), anode nickel-plated or gold-plated copper or brass or polished steel, duration 10 s, distance between cathode and anode 3 mm . An electrolyte of 100 g of litharge dissolved in 0.5 l of water can also be used in which 100 g of NaOH is dissolved. Becquerel used a solution of 200 parts water, 20 potassium hydroxide and 15 litharge. A. Roseleur used a much milder solution of 200 parts of water, 10 parts of potassium hydroxide and 1 part of litharge.

=== 2. Electrolytic coloring according to Elkington ===
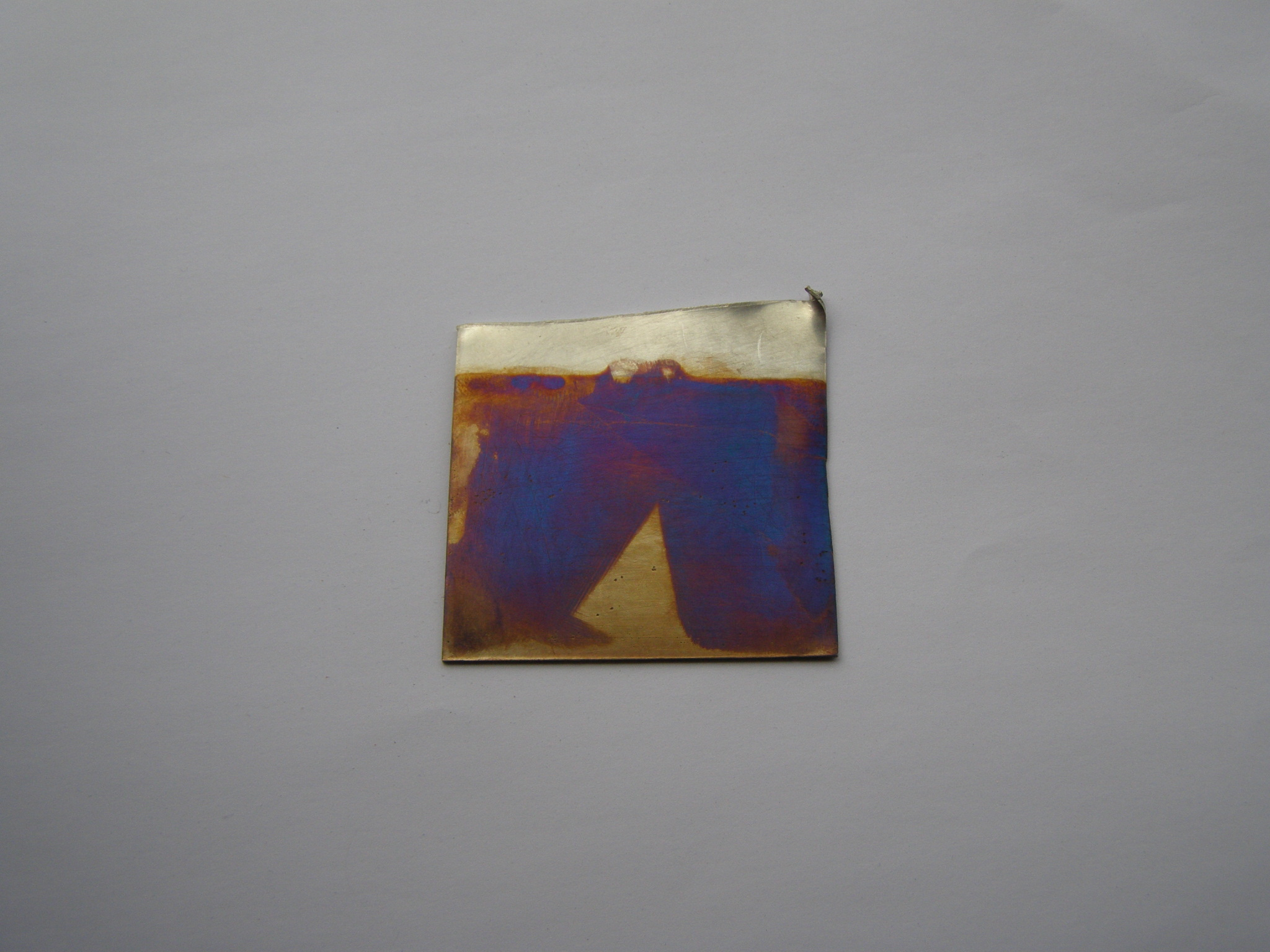
Electrolytic patina on pewter

copper sulfate 75 gr/lit

Sodium hydroxide 75 gr/lit

lactic acid 126 mll/lit

copper anodes, 0.25/A per square foot, gives various colors on copper and alloys, depending on the duration of the process, a large number of variations on this process have been developed, the most famous is the American Elektrocolor process developed by J.E.Stareck, Russian literature mentions more than 10 variants, Ukrainian A.P. Eitchis developed variant for tin plated steel, tin and pewter too (based on J.E. Stareck work).

=== 3. Various colors on titanium (anodic oxidation) ===
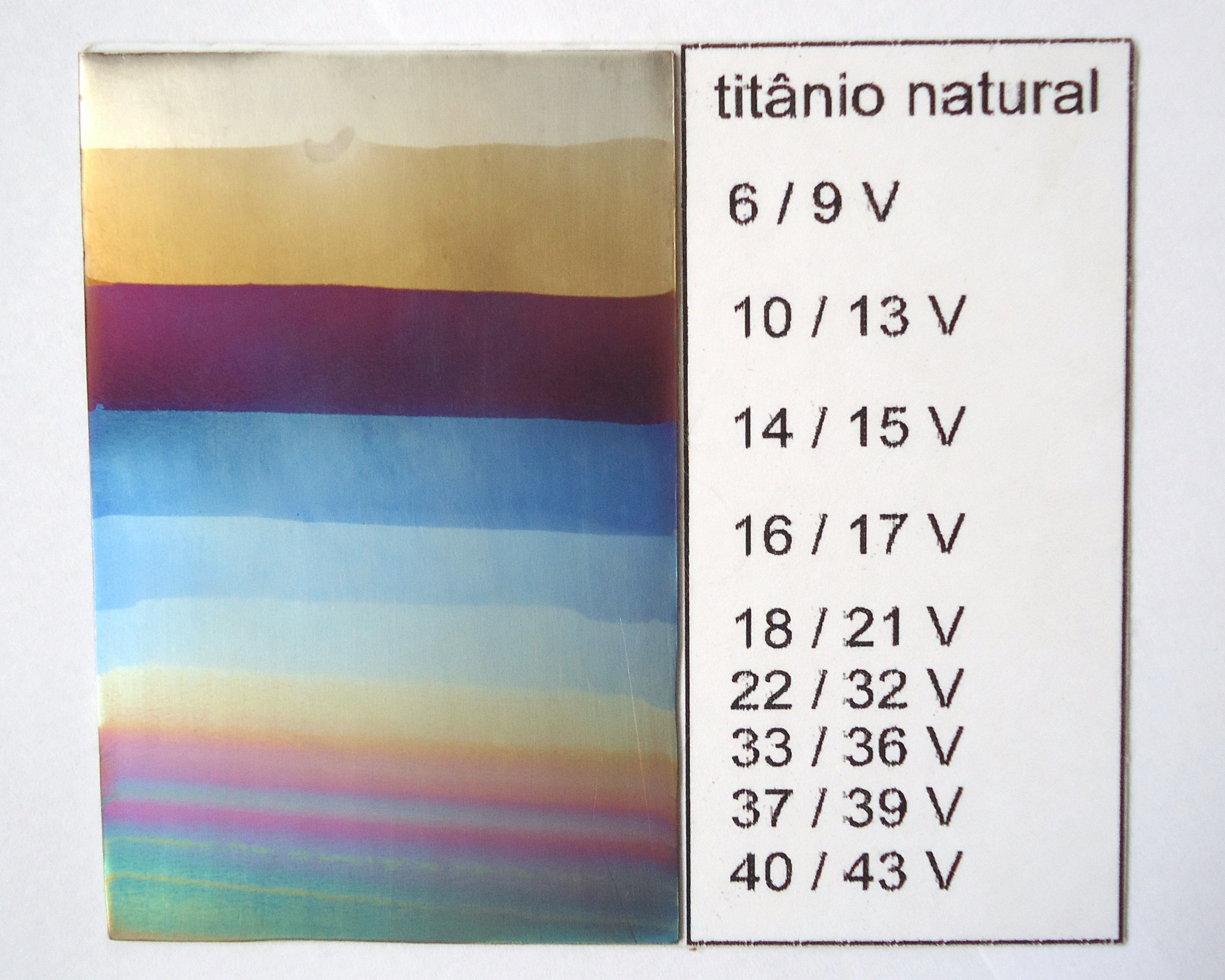
Various colors on titanium (anodic oxidation)

A 3% trisodium phosphate solution can be used as a simple electrolyte, a stainless steel cathode, an object as an anode. The colors depend on the DC voltage. It is possible to use numerous other electrolytes - allegedly even Coca-Cola. Straw Yellow/10v - Magenta/29v - Blue/30v - Blue Green/45v - Bright Green/55v - Magenta Red/75v - Gray/110v It is mandatory to do this process with rubber gloves - potentially dangerous voltage.

=== 4. Black nickel plating ===
nickel sulfate 75 gr/lit

nickel ammonium sulfate 45 gr/lit

zinc sulfate 37.5 gr/lit

ammonium thiocyanate 15 gr / lit

pH 5.6 - 5.9, temp. 55C, 0.5 - 1.5 V, 5 - 20 A /per square foot, nickel carbon anodes

=== 5. Various colors on stainless steel 18 Cr/8 Ni (anodic oxidation) ===
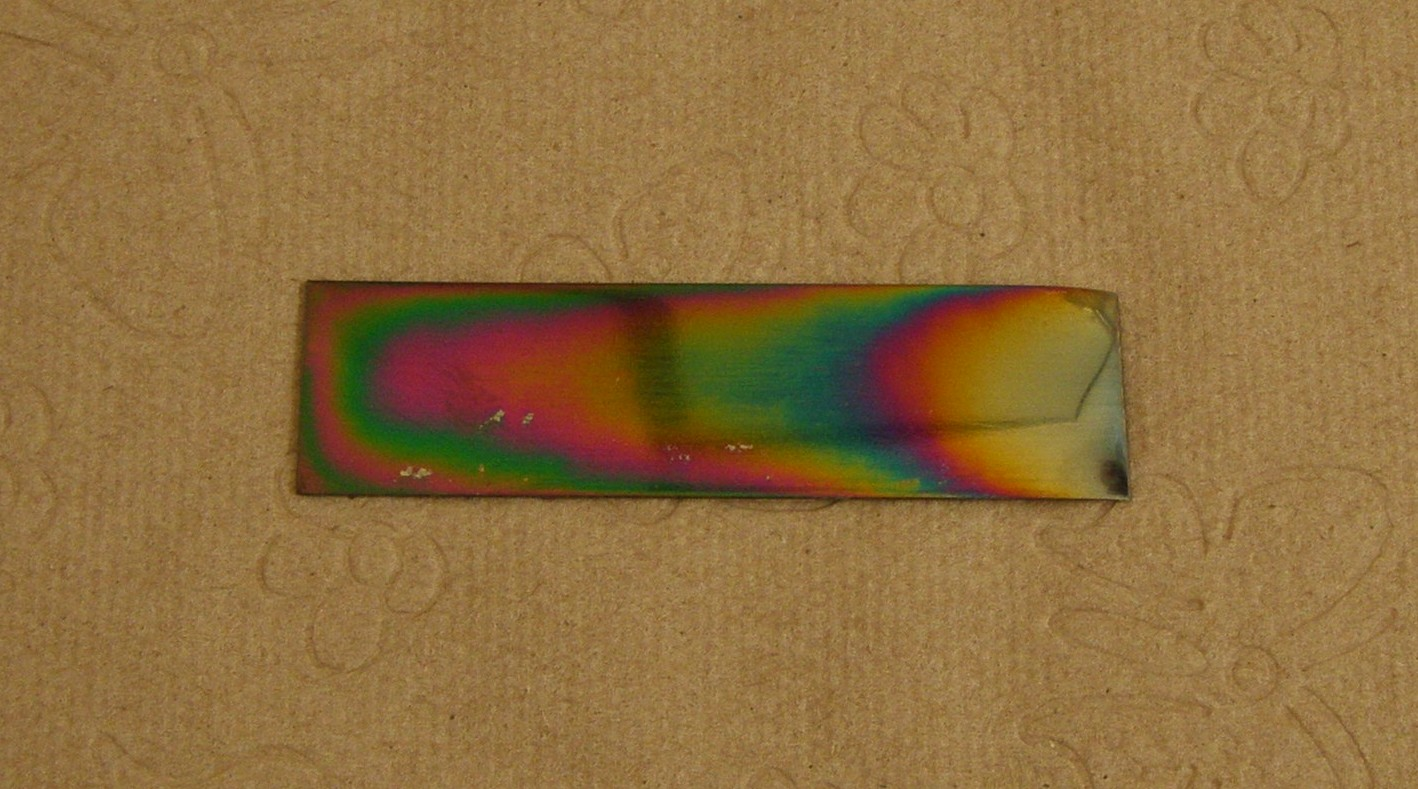
anodized stainless steel test plate (molybdate based solution, it can be used on pewter too)

sulfuric acid 250 ml/lit

sodium bichromate 60 gr/lit

water 1 lit

0.6 A/per square foot, 70 - 95 C, lead cathode, gives brown, blue, purple and green color depending on the duration of the process, there are many variants of this process. According to Russian literature, after processing, the objects should be soaked in a solution of potassium bichromate (5-10%), 5 – 15 minutes, 70 - 90 C solution temperature. According to a Chinese patent, additionally objects can then be treated with a hot sodium waterglass solution (1 - 5%, 95-100 C, 3 - 10 min.). As hexavalent chromium compounds are prohibited for use in the EU based on ROHS regulations and are toxic and carcinogenic, solutions based on molybdate or tungstate are proposed as a replacement (e.g. molybdate 30-100g/ boric acid 10-18 g/manganese sulfate 0.5 - 5 g/1 liter of water, 0.1 - 20 A/dm2, 0.1–15 minutes).

=== 6. Black color on carbon steel (anodic oxidation) ===
sodium hydroxide 700 gr

water 1 lit

5 - 10 A/dm2, 60 - 70 C temp., 30 – 40 minutes

=== 7. Black color on copper and alloys (anodic oxidation) ===
Sodium hydroxide 150 - 200 gr

water 1 lit

up to 2 A/dm2, 80-100 C,10 – 30 minutes

=== 8. Krom ahat (gray lines on a black background) ===
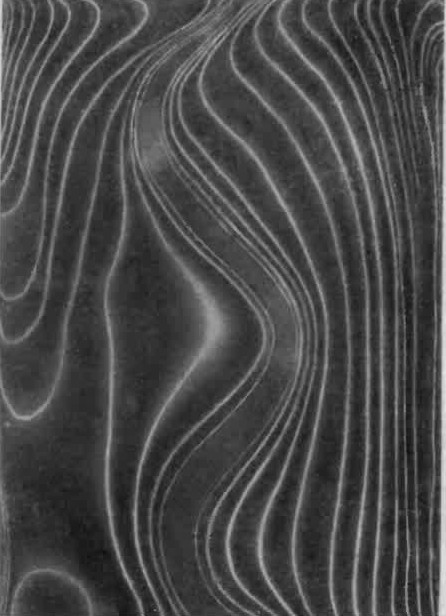
Krom ahat

chromium anhydride 300 – 400 gr

barium acetate 5 – 10 gr

zinc acetate 2 – 5 gr

calcium acetate 4 – 8 gr

water 1 liter, 30 - 40 C, 30 - 100A/dm2, duration 10 - 20 min, 6 - 9v, distance object anode 30 - 100mm. A variant of this procedure is the so-called chromium oxide procedure (250 - 300 gr of chromium anhydride, 1 - 5 gr of potassium ferrocyanide, 20 - 100 A/dm2, max. 25 C)

=== See also ===
- Chemical coloring of metals
- Heat coloring of metals
- Black oxide
- Bluing (steel)
- Anodizing

== Literature ==
Hiorns, A. (1907). Metal Colouring and Bronzing. London: Macmillan and Co. OCLC 3757279.

Kaup, W. J. (1914). Metal Coloring and Finishing. New York City: Industrial Press.

Field, S. (1925). The Chemical Coloring of Metals and Allied Processes. London: Chapman & Hall, Ltd. OCLC 2922065.

Fishlock, D. (1962). Metal Colouring. Teddington: R. Draper. OCLC 3982659.

Hughes, R.; Rowe, M. (1991). The Colouring, Bronzing and Patination of Metals (3rd ed.). London: Thames and Hudson. ISBN 9780500015018. OCLC 24734412.

LaNiece, S.; Craddock, P. (1993). Metal Plating and Patination: Cultural, Technical and Historical Developments. Oxford: Butterworth-Heinemann. ISBN 9780750616119. OCLC 27336439.

Young, R.D. (2000). Contemporary Patination (5th ed.). Escondido: Sculpt-Nouveau. ISBN 9780960374410.

Kipper, P. (2003). Pátinas for Silicon Bronze (2nd ed.). Loveland: Path Publications. ISBN 9780964726901. OCLC 930605479.
