= Leiden papyrus =

Leiden papyrus may refer to:

- Leiden papyrus I 344, better known as the Ipuwer Papyrus (c. 1250 BC)
- Leyden papyrus X (c. 250 AD)
