= Otto Lagercrantz =

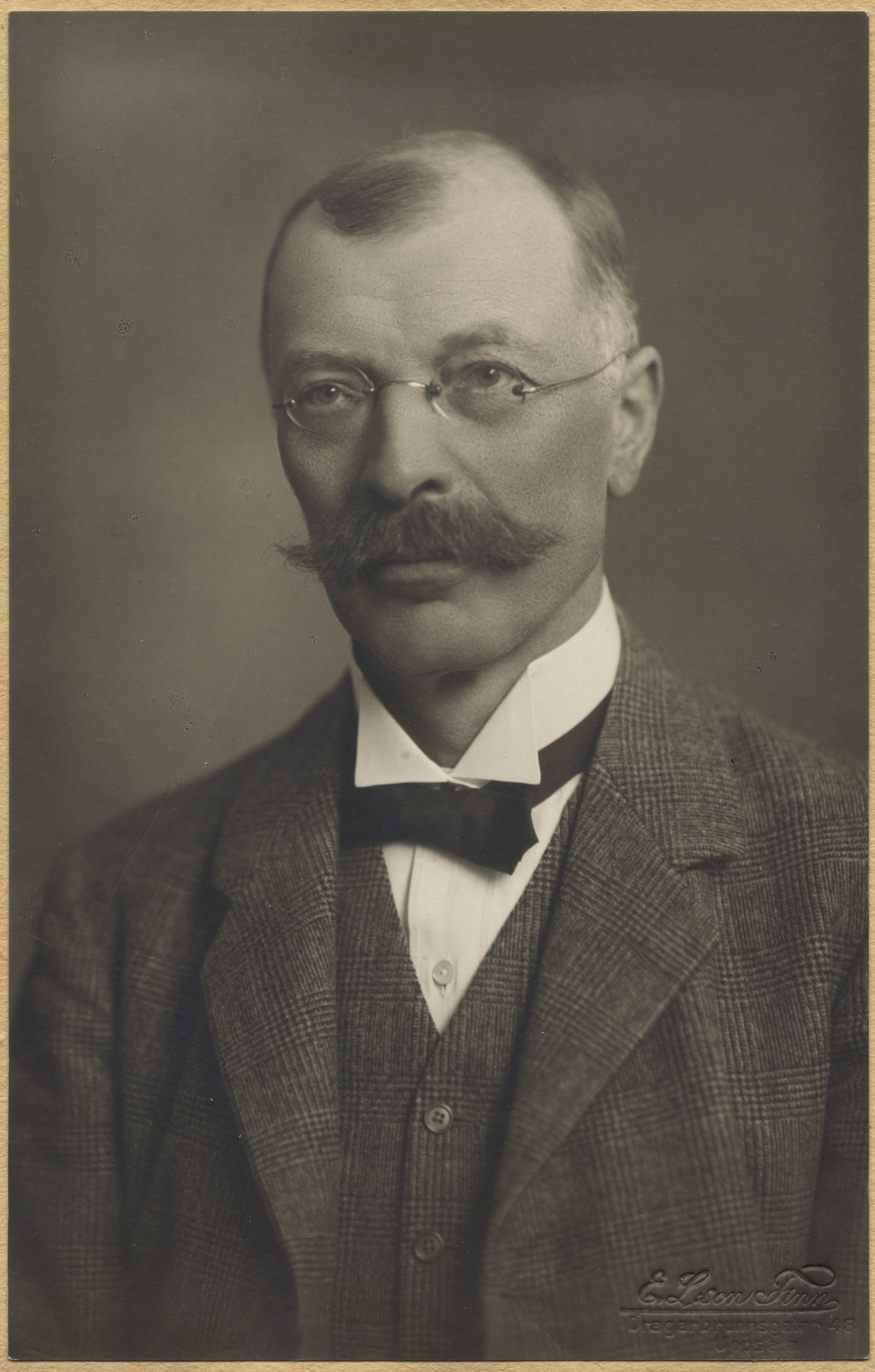

Carl Otto Lagercrantz (26 February 1868 – 13 January 1938) was a Swedish classical philologist and rector of Uppsala University.

== Biography ==
Otto Lagercrantz was born at Näsby in Jönköping County, Sweden. Lagercrantz graduated from high school in Uppsala in 1887. He then studied at Uppsala University, earning his bachelor's degree in 1890 and his licentiate degree in 1895. He completed his Ph.D. in 1898 with a dissertation titled Zur griechischen Lautgeschichte. He then served as professor of Greek, first at the Gothenburg University College and then at Uppsala University. He was appointed prorector of Uppsala University in 1929 and served as its rector 1932–1933.

Lagercrantz had wide scholarly interests. In the field of papyrology, he became an international expert on alchemical manuscripts: he published the Papyrus Graecus Holmiensis in 1913 and was co-publisher of the definitive work in the area, Catalogue des manuscrits alchimiques grecs. His other works concerned Greek drama, etymology, lexicography and the philology of the New Testament.

Lagercrantz undertook study trips to Germany, England, the Netherlands, Italy and Greece. He was elected member of several learned societies: the Royal Society of the Humanities at Uppsala, the Royal Society of Arts and Sciences in Gothenburg, the Royal Society of Letters at Lund and the Royal Swedish Academy of Letters, History and Antiquities.

Academic offices
Preceded by Östen Undén	Rector of Uppsala University; 1932 – 1933	Succeeded by Thore Engströmer
