= Bluing (steel) =

Process that partially protects steel against rust

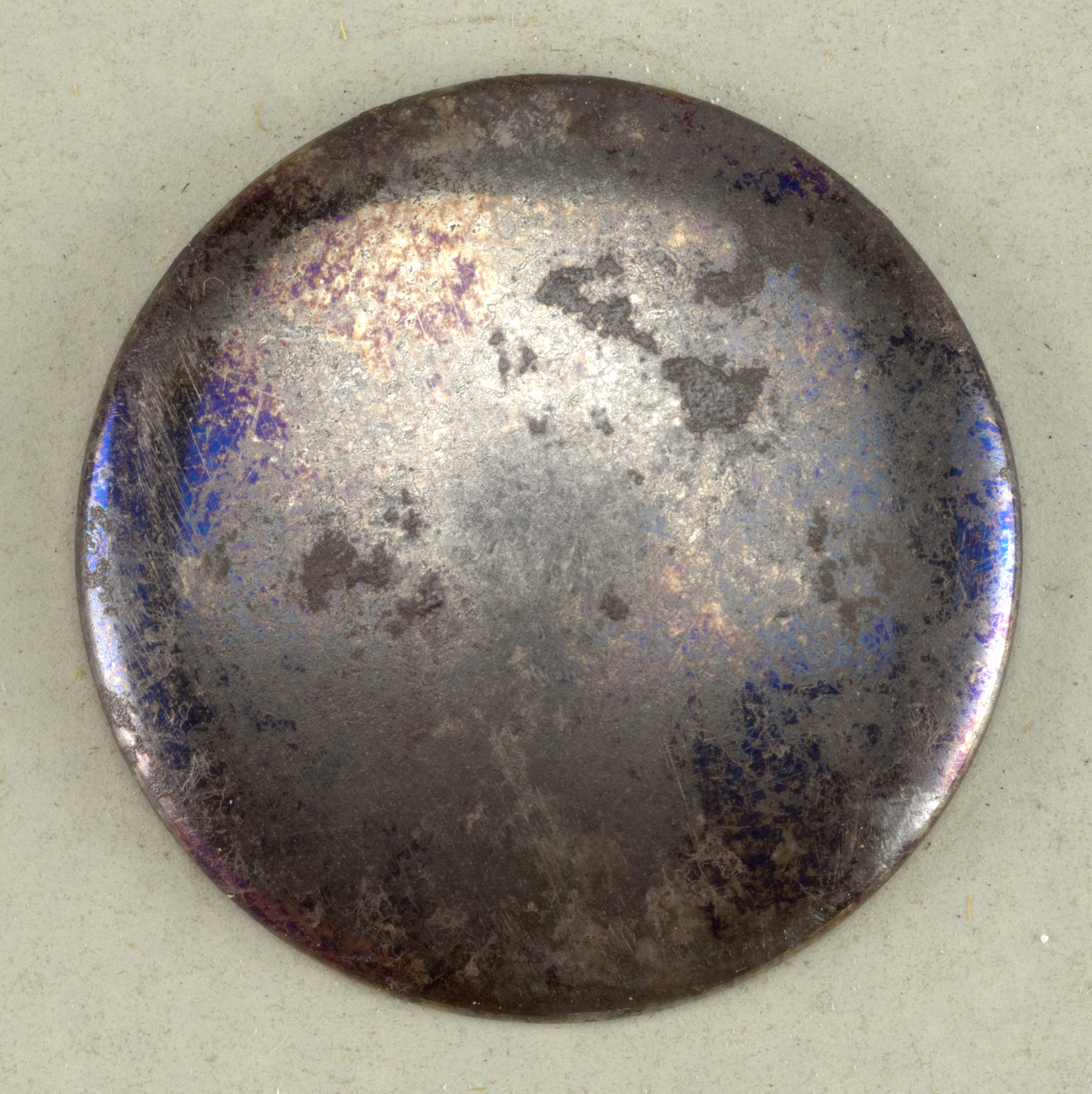
A 19th century blued steel button

Bluing, sometimes spelled as blueing, is a passivation process in which steel is partially protected against rust using a black oxide coating. It is named after the blue-black appearance of the resulting protective finish. Bluing involves an electrochemical conversion coating resulting from an oxidizing chemical reaction with iron on the surface selectively forming magnetite (Fe_{3}O_{4}), the black oxide of iron. In comparison, rust, the red oxide of iron (Fe_{2}O_{3}), undergoes an extremely large volume change upon hydration; as a result, the oxide easily flakes off, causing the typical reddish rusting away of iron. Black oxide provides minimal protection against corrosion, unless also treated with a water-displacing oil to reduce wetting and galvanic action. In colloquial use, thin coatings of black oxide are often termed "gun bluing", while heavier coatings are termed "black oxide". Both refer to the same chemical process for providing true gun bluing.

== Overview ==
Various processes are used to produce the oxide coating.

"Cold" bluing is generally a selenium dioxide-based compound that colours steel black, or more often a very dark grey. It is a difficult product to apply evenly, offers minimal protection and is generally best used for small fast repair jobs and touch-ups.

The "hot" process is an alkali salt solution using potassium nitrite or sodium nitrate and sodium hydroxide, referred to as "traditional caustic black", that is typically done at an elevated temperature, 135 to 155 °C (275 to 311 °F). This method was adopted by larger firearm companies for large scale, more economical bluing. It provides good rust resistance, which is improved with oil.

"Rust bluing" and "fume bluing" provide the best rust and corrosion resistance as the process continually converts any metal that is capable of rusting into magnetite (Fe_{3}O_{4}). Treating with an oiled coating enhances the protection offered by the bluing. This process is also the only process safely used to re-blue vintage shotguns. Many double-barreled shotguns are soft soldered (lead) or silver brazed together and many of the parts are attached by that method as well. The higher temperatures of the other processes as well as their caustic nature could weaken the soldered joints and make the gun hazardous to use.

Bluing can also be done in a furnace, for example for a sword or other item traditionally made by a blacksmith or specialist such as a weapon-smith. Blacksmith products to this day may occasionally be found made from blued steel by traditional craftsmen in cultures and segments of society who use that technology either by necessity or choice.

== Processes ==
=== Hot caustic bluing ===
Bluing may be applied by immersing steel parts in a solution of potassium nitrate, sodium hydroxide, and water heated to the boiling point, 275–310 °F (135–154 °C) depending on the recipe. Similarly, stainless steel parts may be immersed in a mixture of nitrates and chromates, similarly heated. Either of these two methods is called 'hot bluing'. Hot bluing is the current standard in gun bluing, as both it and rust bluing provide the most permanent degree of rust-resistance and cosmetic protection of exposed gun metal, and hot bluing takes less time than rust bluing.

=== Rust bluing ===
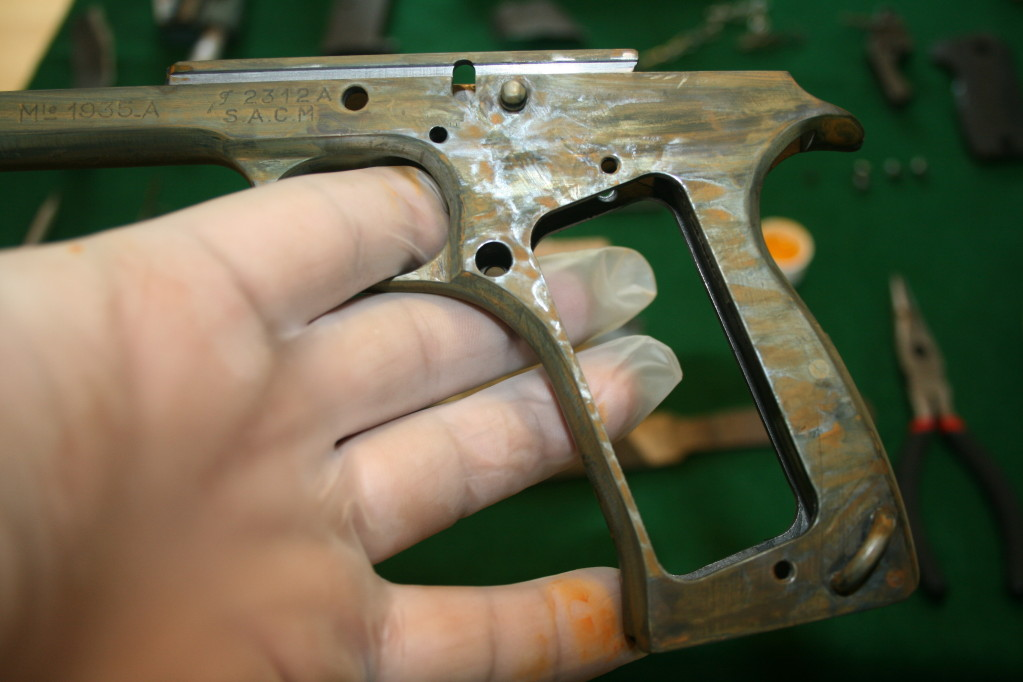
Acid solution applied to bare metal

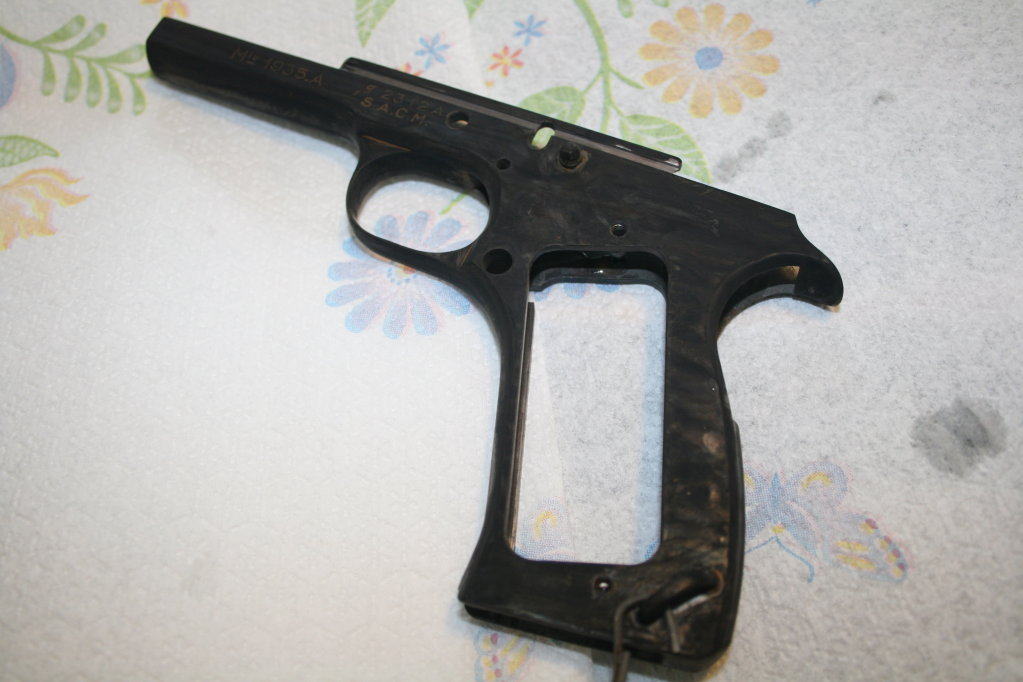
After boiling rusted parts

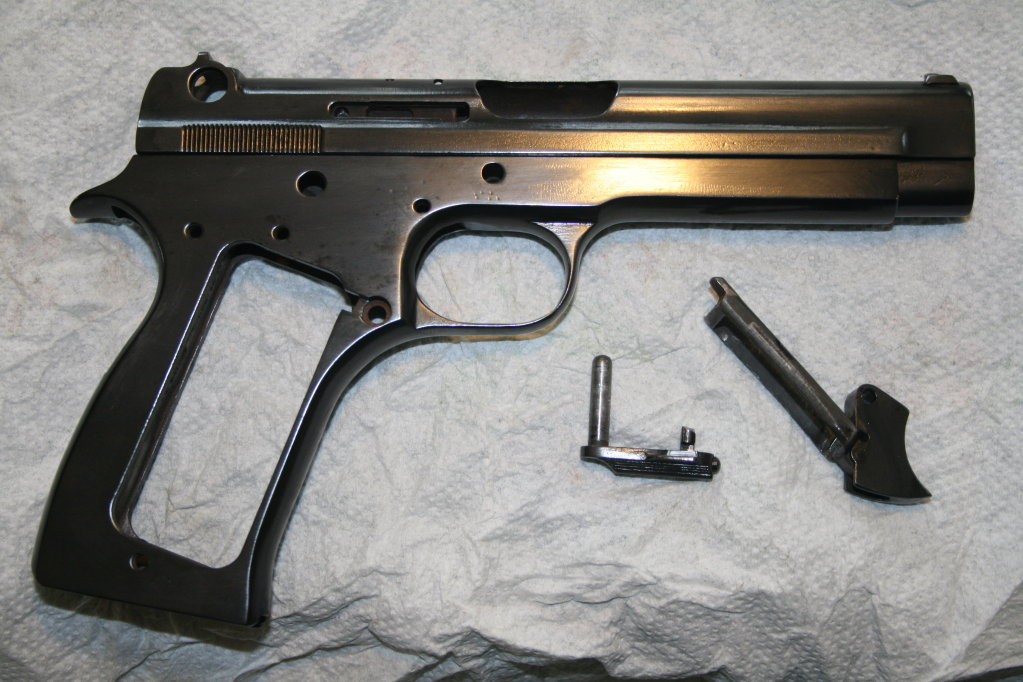
After eight rust, carding and oiling sessions

Rust bluing was developed between hot and cold bluing processes, and was originally used by gunsmiths in the 19th century to blue firearms prior to the development of hot bluing processes. The process was to coat the gun parts in an acid solution, let the parts rust uniformly, then immerse the parts in boiling water to convert the red oxide Fe_{2}O_{3} to black oxide Fe_{3}O_{4}, which forms a more protective, stable coating than the red oxide; the boiling water also removes any remaining residue from the applied acid solution (often nitric acid and hydrochloric acid diluted in water). The loose oxide was then carded (scrubbed) off, using a carding brush – a wire brush with soft, thin (usually about 0.002 in (0.051 mm) thick) wires – or wheel.

This process was repeated until the desired depth of color was achieved or the metal simply did not color further. This is one of the reasons rust and fume bluing are generally more rust-resistant than other methods. The parts are then oiled and allowed to stand overnight. This process leaves a deep blue-black finish.

Modern home hobbyist versions of this process typically use a hydrogen peroxide and salt solution, sometimes preceded with a vinegar soak, for the rusting step to avoid the need for more dangerous acids.

=== Fume bluing ===
Fume bluing is another process similar to rust bluing. Instead of applying the acid solution directly to the metal parts, the parts are placed in a sealed cabinet with a moisture source, a container of nitric acid and a container of hydrochloric acid. The mixed fumes of the acids produce a uniform rust on the surface of the parts (inside and out) in about 12 hours. The parts are then boiled in distilled water, blown dry, then carded, as with rust bluing.

These processes were later abandoned by major firearm manufacturers as it often took parts days to finish completely, and was very labor-intensive. They are still sometimes used by gunsmiths to obtain an authentic finish for a period gun of the time that rust bluing was in vogue, analogous to the use of browning on earlier representative firearm replicas. Rust bluing is also used on shotgun barrels that are soldered to the rib between the barrels, as hot bluing solutions melt the solder during the bluing process.

Large scale industrial hot bluing is often performed using a bluing furnace. This is an alternative method for creating the black oxide coating. In place of using a hot bath (although at a lower temperature) chemically induced method, it is possible through controlling the temperature to heat steel precisely such as to cause the formation of black oxide selectively over the red oxide. It, too, must be oiled to provide any significant rust resistance.

=== Cold bluing ===
There are also methods of cold bluing, which do not require heat. Commercial products are widely sold in small bottles for cold bluing firearms, and these products are primarily used by individual gun owners for implementing small touch-ups to a gun's finish, to prevent a small scratch from becoming a major source of rust on a gun over time. Cold bluing is not particularly resistant to holster wear, nor does it provide a large degree of rust resistance. Often it does provide an adequate cosmetic touch-up of a gun's finish when applied and additionally oiled on a regular basis. However, rust bluing small areas often match, blend, and wear better than any cold bluing process.

At least one of the cold bluing solutions contains selenium dioxide (first mentioned 1904). These work by depositing a coating of copper selenide on the surface.

=== Nitre bluing ===
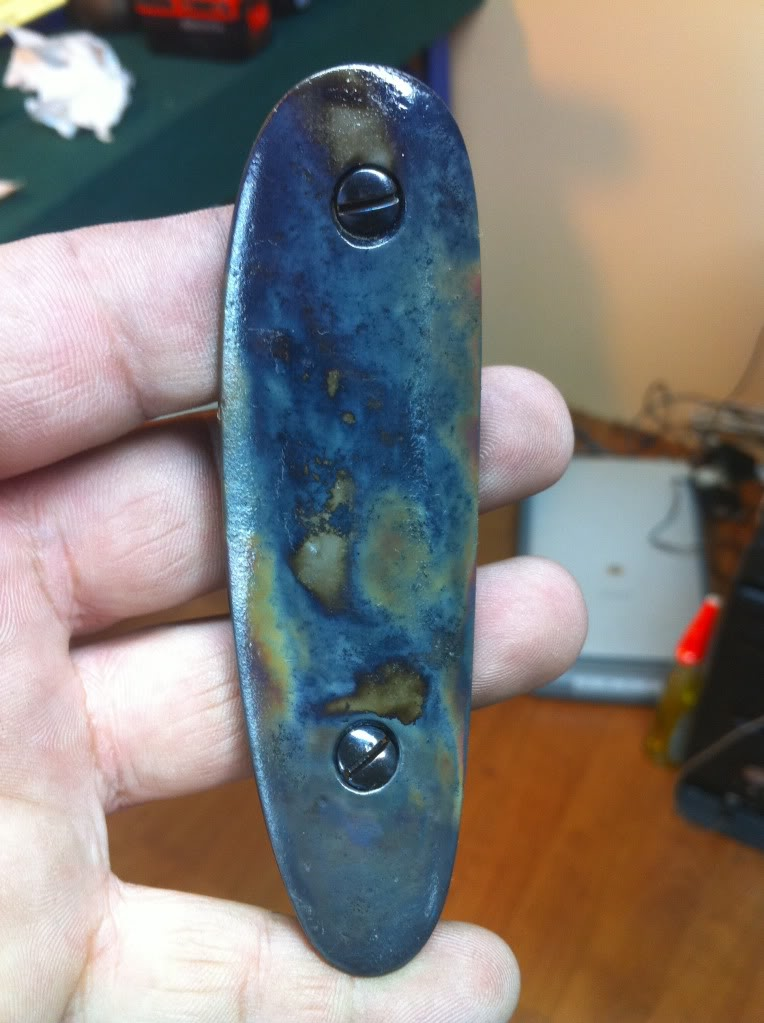
Niter and colour case

In the nitre bluing process, polished and cleaned steel parts are immersed in a bath of molten salts—typically potassium nitrate and sodium nitrate (sometimes with 9.4 grams (0.33 oz) of manganese dioxide per pound of total nitrate). The mixture is heated to 310 to 321 °C (590 to 610 °F) and the parts are suspended in this solution with wire. The parts must be observed constantly for colour change. The cross section and size of parts affect the outcome of the finish and time it takes to achieve. This method must not be used on critically heat-treated parts such as receivers, slides or springs. It is generally employed on smaller parts such as pins, screws, sights, etc. The colours range through straw, gold, brown, purple, blue, teal, then black. Examples of this finish are common on older pocket watches whose hands exhibit what is called 'peacock blue', a rich iridescent blue.

=== Color case hardening ===
Color case hardening is the predecessor of all metal coloring typically employed in the firearms industry. Contemporary heat-treatable steels did not exist or were in their infancy. Soft, low-carbon steel was used, but strong materials were needed for the receivers of firearms. Initially case hardening was used but did not offer any aesthetics. Colour case hardening occurs when soft steels were packed in a reasonably airtight crucible in a mixture of charred leather, bone charcoal and wood charcoal. This crucible was heated to 730 °C (1,350 °F) for up to 6 hours (the longer the heat was applied the thicker the case hardening). At the end of this heating process the crucible is removed from the oven and positioned over a bath of water with air forced through a perforated coil in the bottom of the bath. The bottom of the crucible is opened allowing the contents to drop into the rapidly bubbling water. The differential cooling causes patterns of colors to appear as well as hardening the part.

Different colors can be achieved through variations of this method including quenching in oil instead of water.

=== Browning ===
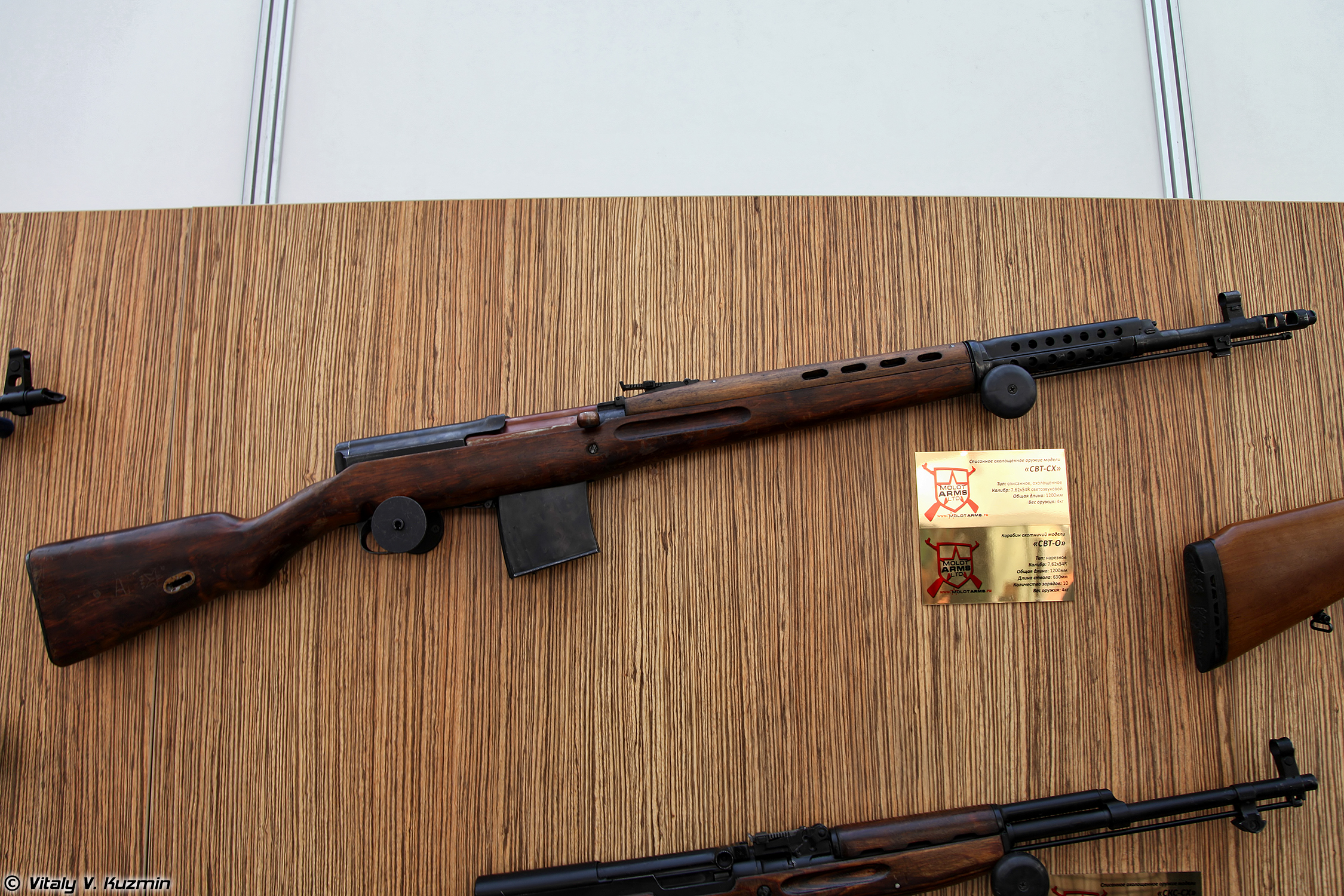
Plumbing is common on Soviet era firearms. Note the plumb brown colored bolt of the SVT rifle. The plum was the result of higher chromium content in the bluing bath, as well as temperature/time duration. These were being refurbed en masse so these big bluing baths were basically running 24/7 and the ratios of chemicals was constantly changing as rifles were being blued and as workers were replenishing the bluing baths.

"Browning" is controlled red rust Fe_{2}O_{3} and is also known as "pluming" or "plum brown". One can generally use the same solution to brown as to blue. The difference is immersion in boiling water for bluing. The rust then turns to black-blue Fe_{3}O_{4}. Many older browning and bluing formulas are based on corrosive solutions (necessary to cause metal to rust) and often contain cyanide or mercury salts solutions that are especially toxic to humans.

A similar process applies for anodizing that can turn purple. Many people have theorized that the original anodizing chemistry plus long exposure to UV light creates the purple. Many have tried to re-create it by baking the object in an oven.

== Applications ==
Bluing is most commonly used by gun manufacturers, gunsmiths, and gun owners to improve the cosmetic appearance of and provide a measure of corrosion resistance to their firearms. It is also used by machinists, to protect and beautify tools made for their own use. Bluing also helps to maintain the metal finish by resisting superficial scratching, and also helps to reduce glare to the eyes of the shooter when looking down the sights of the gun. All blued parts still require oiling to prevent rust. Bluing, being a chemical conversion coating, is not as robust against wear and corrosion resistance as plated coatings, and is typically no thicker than 2.5 micrometres (0.0001 inches). For this reason, it is considered not to add any appreciable thickness to precisely-machined parts. Friction, as from holster wear, quickly removes cold bluing, and also removes hot bluing, rust, or fume bluing over long periods of use. It is usually inadvisable to use cold bluing as a touch-up where friction is present. If cold bluing is the only practical option, the area should be kept oiled to extend the life of the coating as much as possible.

New guns are typically available in blued finish options offered as the least-expensive finish, and this finish is also the least effective at providing rust resistance, relative to other finishes such as Parkerizing or hard chrome plating or nitriding processes like Tenifer.

Bluing is also used for providing coloring for steel parts of fine clocks and other fine metalwork. This is often achieved without chemicals by simply heating the steel until a blue oxide film appears. The blue appearance of the oxide film is also used as an indication of temperature when tempering carbon steel after hardening, indicating a state of temper suitable for springs.

Bluing is also used in seasoning carbon steel cookware, to render it relatively rust-proof and non-stick. In this case cooking oil, rather than gun oil, acts to displace water and prevent rust.

Premium fencing blades are often offered with a blued finish. This finish allows them to be stored in high-moisture conditions, like sports bags, without rusting.

Bluing is often a hobbyist endeavor, and there are many methods of bluing, and continuing debates about the relative efficacy of each method.

Historically, razor blades were often blued steel. A non-linear resistance property of the blued steel of razor blades, foreshadowing the same property later discovered in semiconductor diode junctions, along with the ready availability of blued steel razor blades, led to the use of razor blades as a detector in crystal set AM radios that were built by servicemen (as foxhole radios) or by prisoners of war during World War II.

== See also ==
- Chemical coloring of metals – Process of changing the color of metal surfaces with different chemical solutions
- Electrochemical coloring of metals
- Heat coloring of metals
- Patina
- Phosphate conversion coating
- Tempering (metallurgy)
