= Papyrus Graecus Holmiensis =

Papyrus on alchemy

The Papyrus Graecus Holmiensis (also known as the Stockholm papyrus) is a collection of craft recipes compiled in Egypt c. 300 AD. It is written in Greek. The Stockholm papyrus has 154 recipes for dyeing, coloring gemstones, cleaning (purifying) pearls, and imitation gold and silver. Certain of them may derive from the Pseudo-Democritus. Zosimos of Panopolis, an Egyptian alchemist of c. 300 AD, gives similar recipes. Some of these recipes are found in medieval Latin collections of technological recipes, notably the Mappae clavicula.

Leyden papyrus X derives from the same (or very similar) sources, and is written in a similar (possibly the same) hand, using chemically identical ink. The Stockholm papyrus and Leyden papyrus X were both found in Thebes by Giovanni Anastasi, who donated the Leyden papyrus to the Dutch government in 1828 and the Stockholm papyrus to the Swedish government in 1832. The Stockholm papyrus was first published by Otto Lagercrantz in 1913. Whereas Leyden papyrus X deals with metallurgy, the Stockholm papyrus deals with gems, pearls and textile dyeing.

== Sources ==
- Caley, E. R. (1927) “The Stockholm Papyrus : An English Translation with brief notes” Journal of Chemical Education IV:8 : 979–1002.
- Lagercrantz, Otto (1913) Papyrus Graecus Holmiensis, Uppsala: Almquist and Wiksells (Edition and German Translation).
