= Heat coloring of metals =

Metalworking process

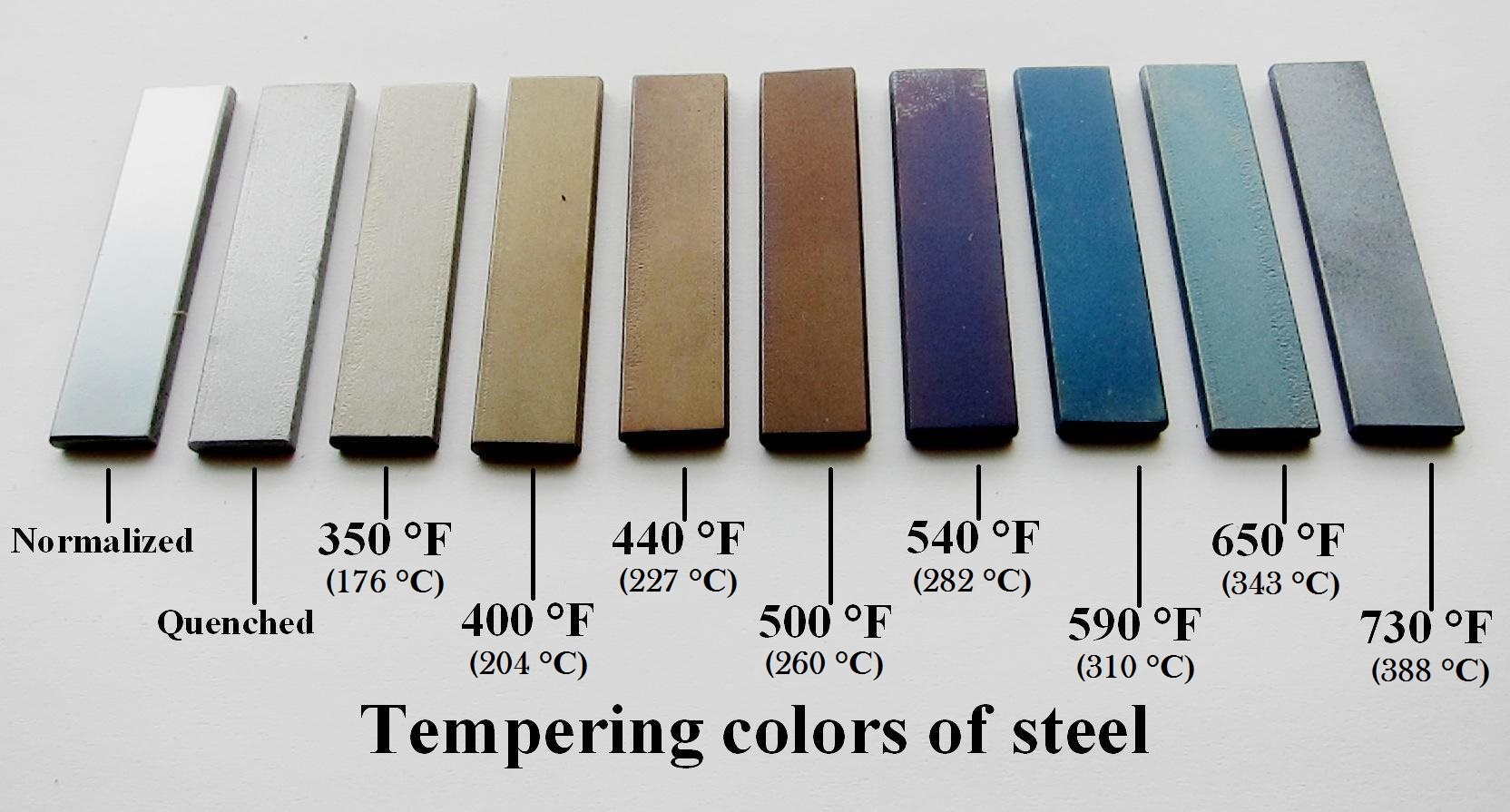
Scale of colors obtained by heat coloring of steel. This process is known as tempering when it is applied to the hardening of tools made of steel.

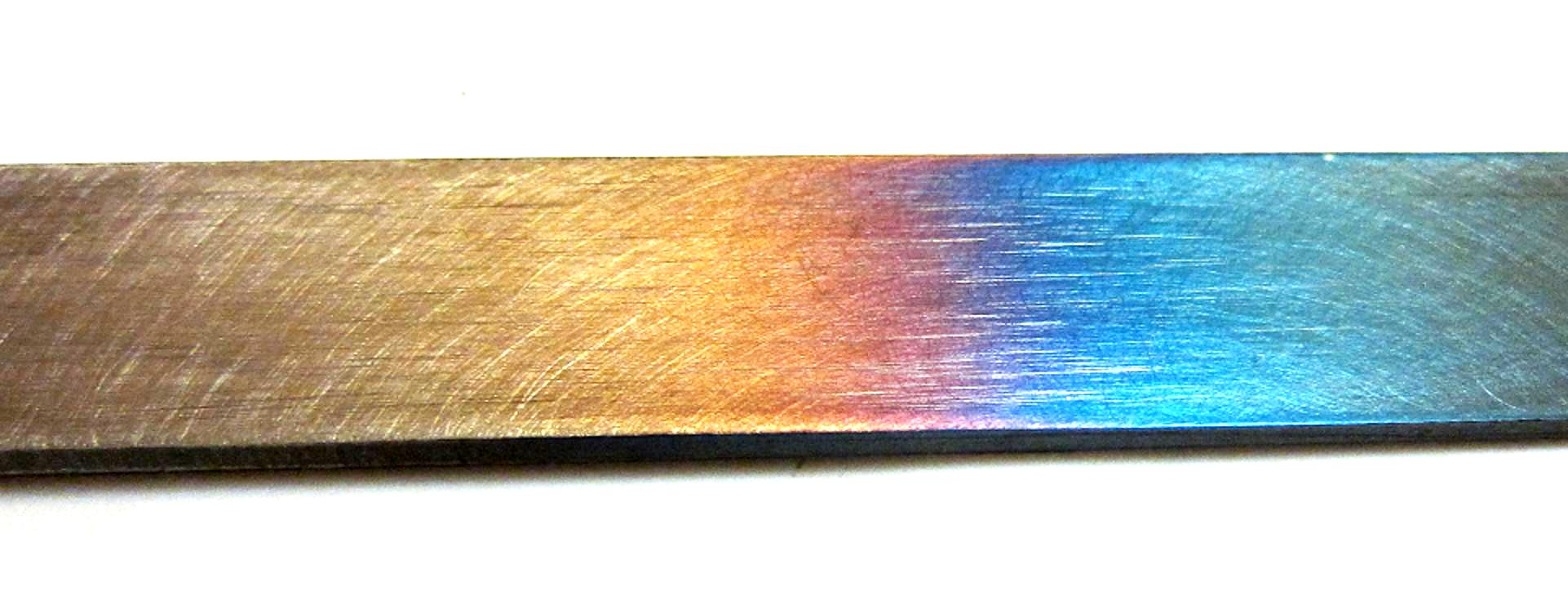
The various colors produced indicate the temperature the steel was heated to. Light straw indicates 204 °C (399 °F), and light blue indicates 337 °C (639 °F).

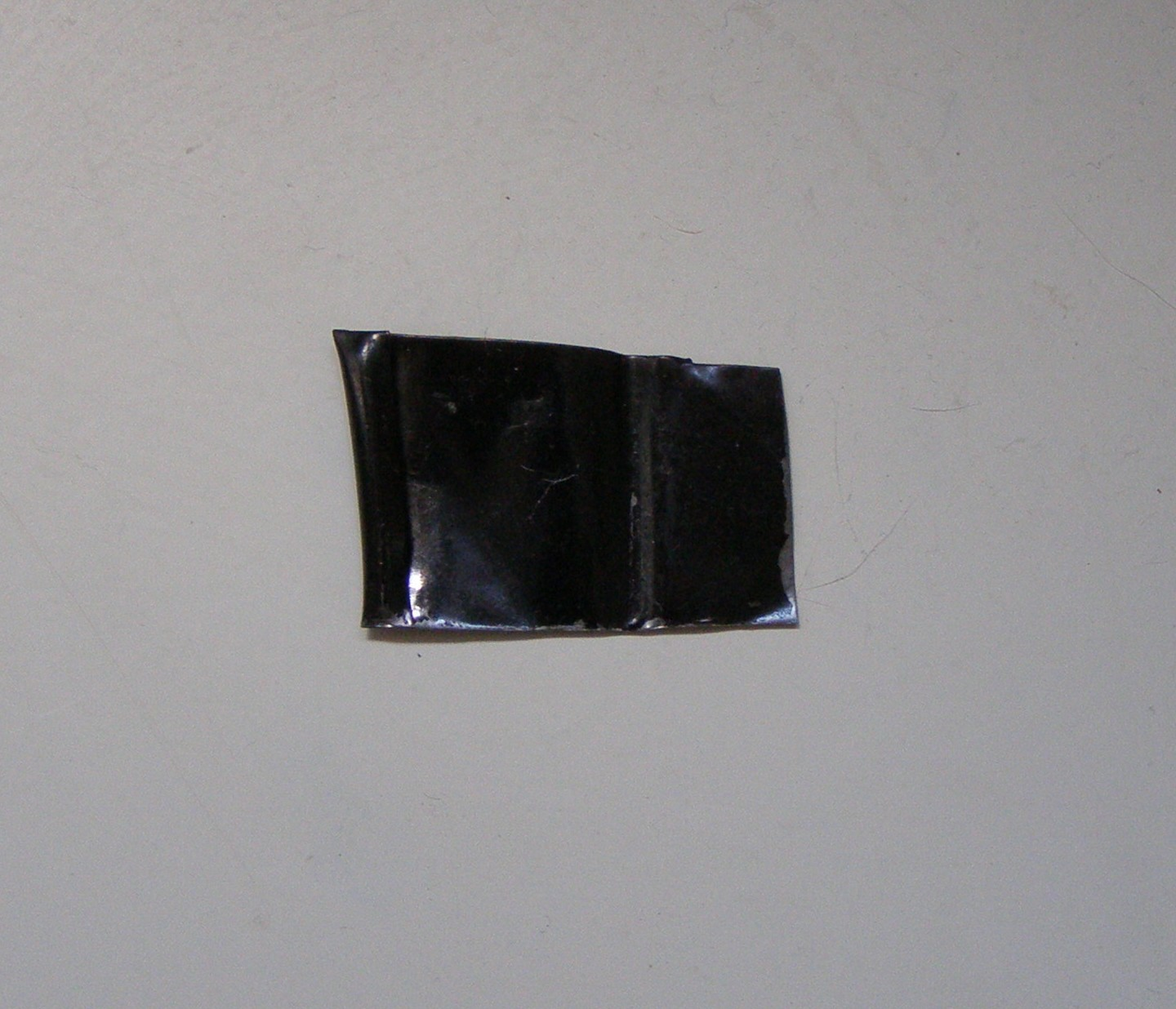
Blackened steel test plate, oiled with linseed oil and then heated to 300–400 °C

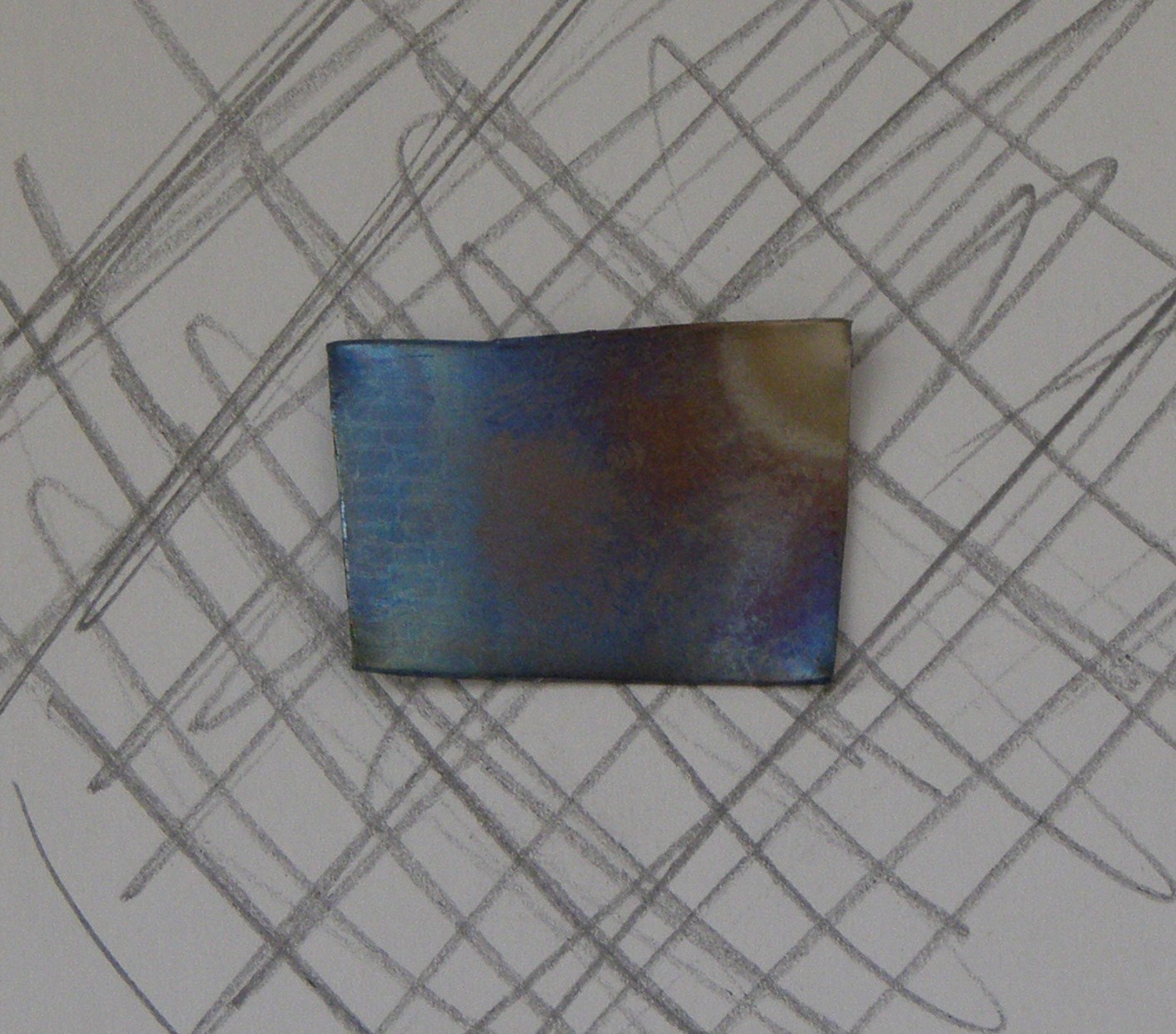
Titanium test plate, colored by heat

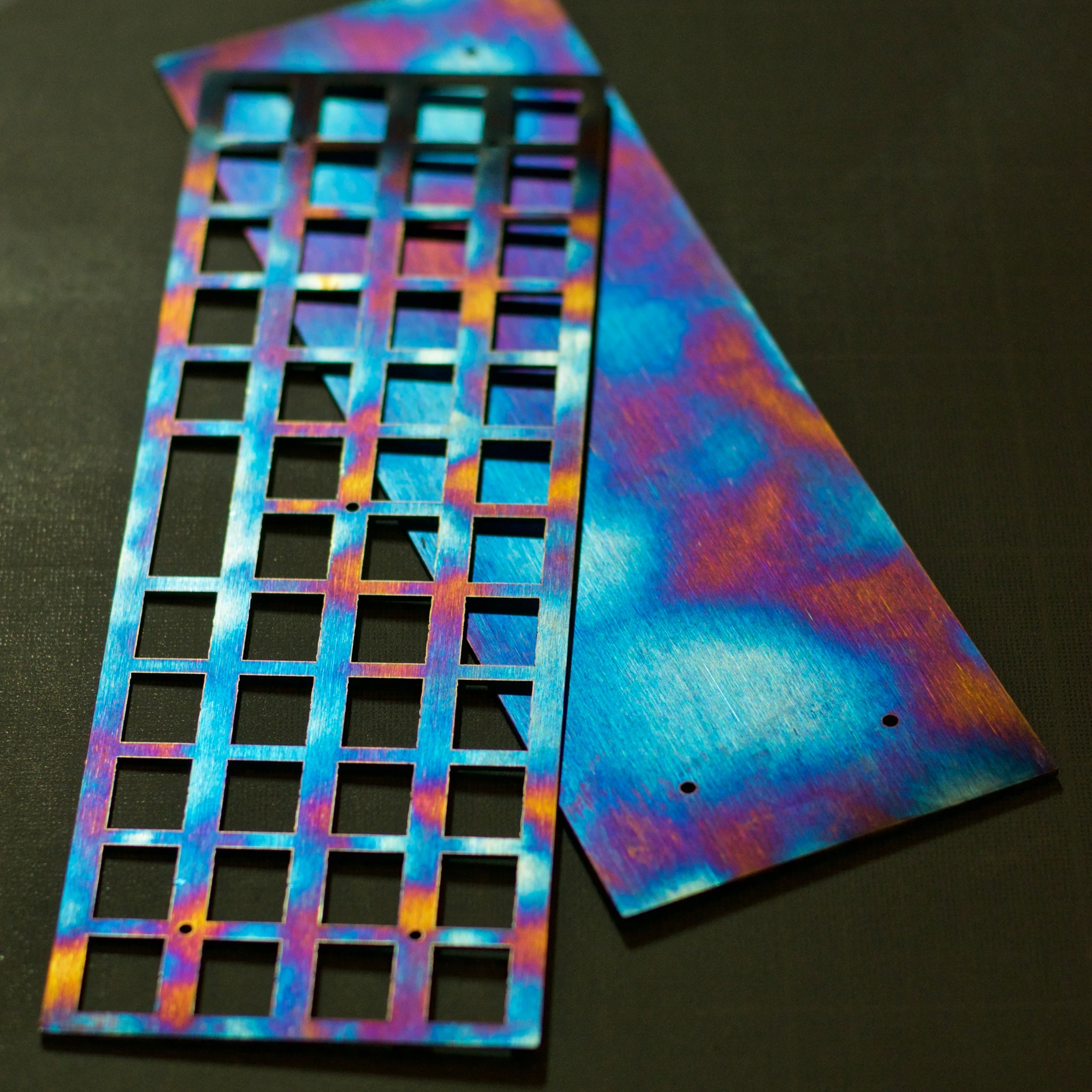
Stainless steel plates, colored by heat tinting

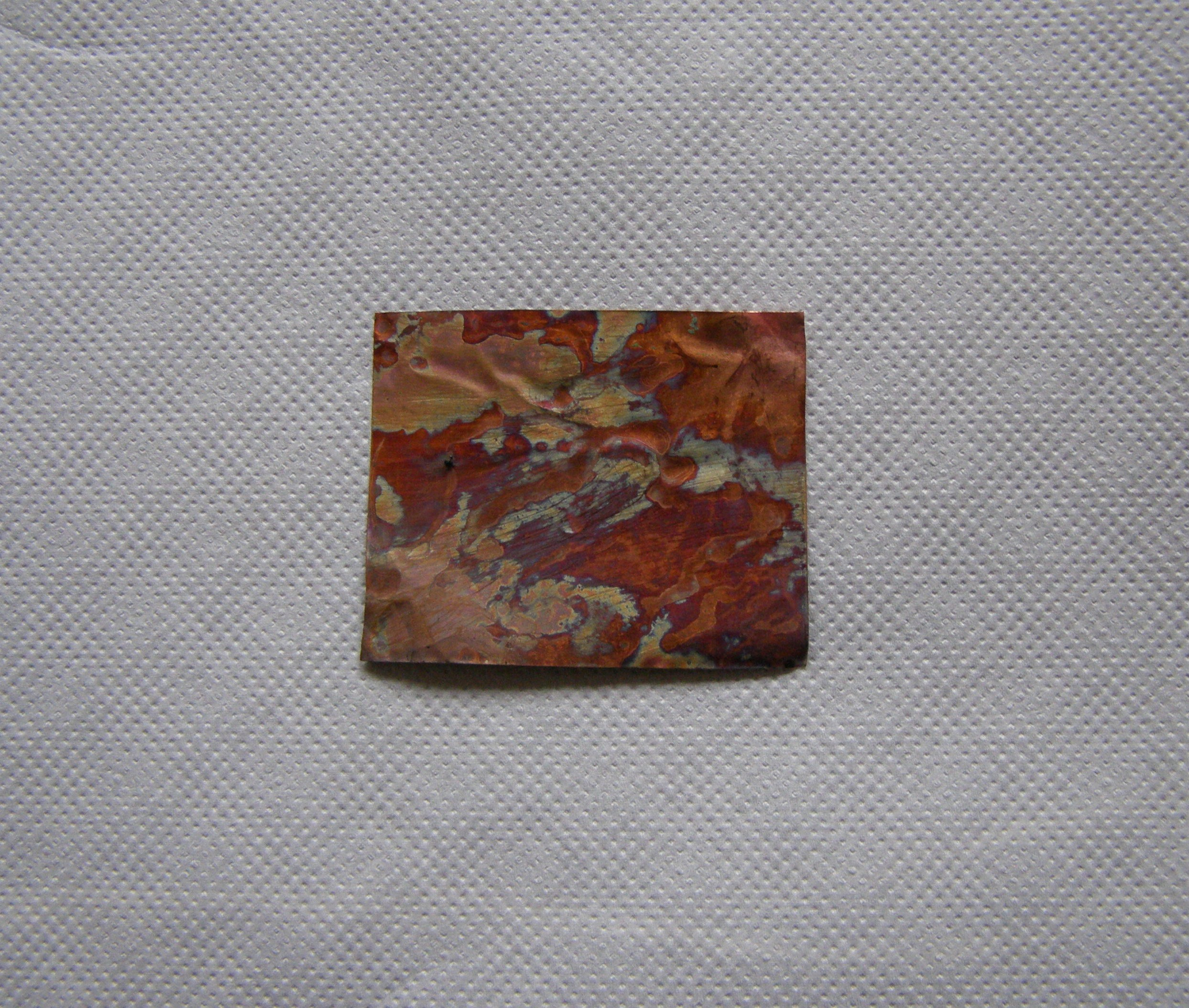
Copper test plate, colored by heat

Heat coloring of metals is a relatively simple process that, in principle, produces interference colors on the surface of the metal. The colors depend on the temperature to which the metal is heated. The most obvious example is thermally produced colors on steel, of which blue coloring is most commonly used. In addition to steel, colors can be produced by heat on copper and its alloys, nickel, chromium, niobium, titanium, and tantalum.

Heat coloring of metals can also include procedures for obtaining brown or black color by gradually heating objects made of gilt copper (also known as vernis brun) or steel coated with linseed oil to 300–400 °C.

This process also includes the Bower–Barff process and related processes, in which the steel is heated to 800 °C and exposed to highly heated steam.

== History ==
Heat coloring of metals is probably the oldest method of coloring metal objects.

== Examples ==
=== Heat coloring of iron and steel ===
- straw yellow: 232 °C
- brown: 265 °C
- purple red: 277 °C
- light blue: 288 °C
- dark blue: 293 °C

=== Heat coloring of stainless steel ===
- light yellow: 290 °C
- brown: 390 °C
- magenta: 450 °C
- blue: 540 °C
- dark blue: 600 °C

=== Heat coloring of titanium ===
- pale gold straw: 385 °C
- purple:412 °C
- deep blue: 440 °C
- red purple: 565 °C
- light green: 510 °C
- brown gray: 648 °C
- green blue: 925 °C

=== Heat coloring of copper and its alloys ===
Heating to a temperature of 161–341 °C produces various interference colors, ranging from pale yellow, red, violet, and finally black. Unlike steel, this patina is non-permanent and more tedious.

== Literature ==
- Hiorns, A. (1907). Metal Colouring and Bronzing. London: Macmillan and Co. OCLC 3757279.
- Kaup, W. J. (1914). Metal Coloring and Finishing. New York City: Industrial Press.
- Field, S. (1925). The Chemical Coloring of Metals and Allied Processes. London: Chapman & Hall, Ltd. OCLC 2922065.
- Fishlock, D. (1962). Metal Colouring. Teddington: R. Draper. OCLC 3982659.

== See also ==
- Chemical coloring of metals
- Electrochemical coloring of metals
- Black oxide
- Bluing (steel)
- Anodizing
