= Mappae clavicula =

Medieval recipes for crafts materials

The mappae clavicula is a medieval Latin text containing manufacturing recipes for crafts materials, including for metals, glass, mosaics, and dyes and tints for materials. The information and style in the recipes is very terse. Each recipe consists of the names of the ingredients and typically about two sentences on combining the ingredients together. A small minority of the recipes go to about six sentences. The text comes with a short preamble, and other than that it is just recipes. The number of recipes was expanded over the course of the medieval centuries, and some medieval copies have deletions as well as additions, so it is better thought of as a family of texts with a largely common core, not a single text. Most of the Mappae Clavicula recipes are also in medieval Latin in a text known as the Compositiones ad Tingenda (English: "Recipes for Coloring (or Tingeing)").

== Origin and accretion ==
The core was probably originally compiled around AD 600, perhaps in Alexandria in Egypt, in Greek. The core contains items traceable to earlier Alexandrian Greek texts, particularly the Stockholm papyrus and Leiden Papyrus X, which are Greek texts dated to the 2nd or 3rd century AD that contain some of the same and similar recipes. The first few recipes in the Phillipps-Corning manuscript of the Mappae clavicula were long considered integral, but they form a distinct separate entity, the De coloribus et mixtionibus, which survives (in whole or in part) in at least 62 manuscripts. The core of the Latin Mappae clavicula is very likely a translation of a Greek text, although the original Greek text (if it existed) does not exist today.

The best manuscripts of the Mappae clavicula date from the eighth to the twelfth century.

One of the fullest collections of recipes is in a certain manuscript dated late 12th century in which about 300 recipes are presented. In this manuscript, called the Phillipps-Corning manuscript, some of the names for some materials are Arabic names (e.g. alquibriz from the Arabic for sulphur, atincar from the Arabic for borax, alcazir from the Arabic for tin). The recipes containing the Arabic names are historically later, and are in all likelihood no earlier than the 12th century. Certain earlier manuscripts have about 200 recipes.

== Example ==
Here is a translation of one recipe for joining tin:

1 part of soap, 1 part of pine resin, 1 part of soda and some borax. Coat the tin with this and heat lightly, as you know how, until it joins together, and quench it while still hot in water.

== Manuscripts ==
The principal manuscripts are:

- The Lucca MS, Lucca, Biblioteca Capitolare Feliniana, Codex 490, the oldest witness, c. 800.
- The Sélestat MS, Sélestat, Bibliothèque Humaniste, MS 17. A very full yet old witness, early ninth century.
- The Codex Matritensis ('Madrid codex'), Madrid, Biblioteca Nacional, MS A.16 (Was: MS A.19), c. 1130.
- The Phillipps-Corning Manuscript, Corning Museum of Glass, MS 5, late twelfth century.

These are simply among the fullest witnesses - there are dozens more that preserve extracts.

== Title ==
The title, Mappae clavicula, is absurd, translating approximately as 'the little key to the small cloth'. The best explanation is that it is a mis-translation from a Greek original, in which χειρόκμητον kheirókmēton ('knack' or 'trick of the trade') was mis-read as χειρόμακτρον kheirómaktron ('hand-towel'). This is consistent with the observation that certain recipes derive from the Greek technical papyri, the Leyden papyrus X and the Stockholm papyrus.
