= Rudolf Christian Böttger =

German chemist (1806–1881)

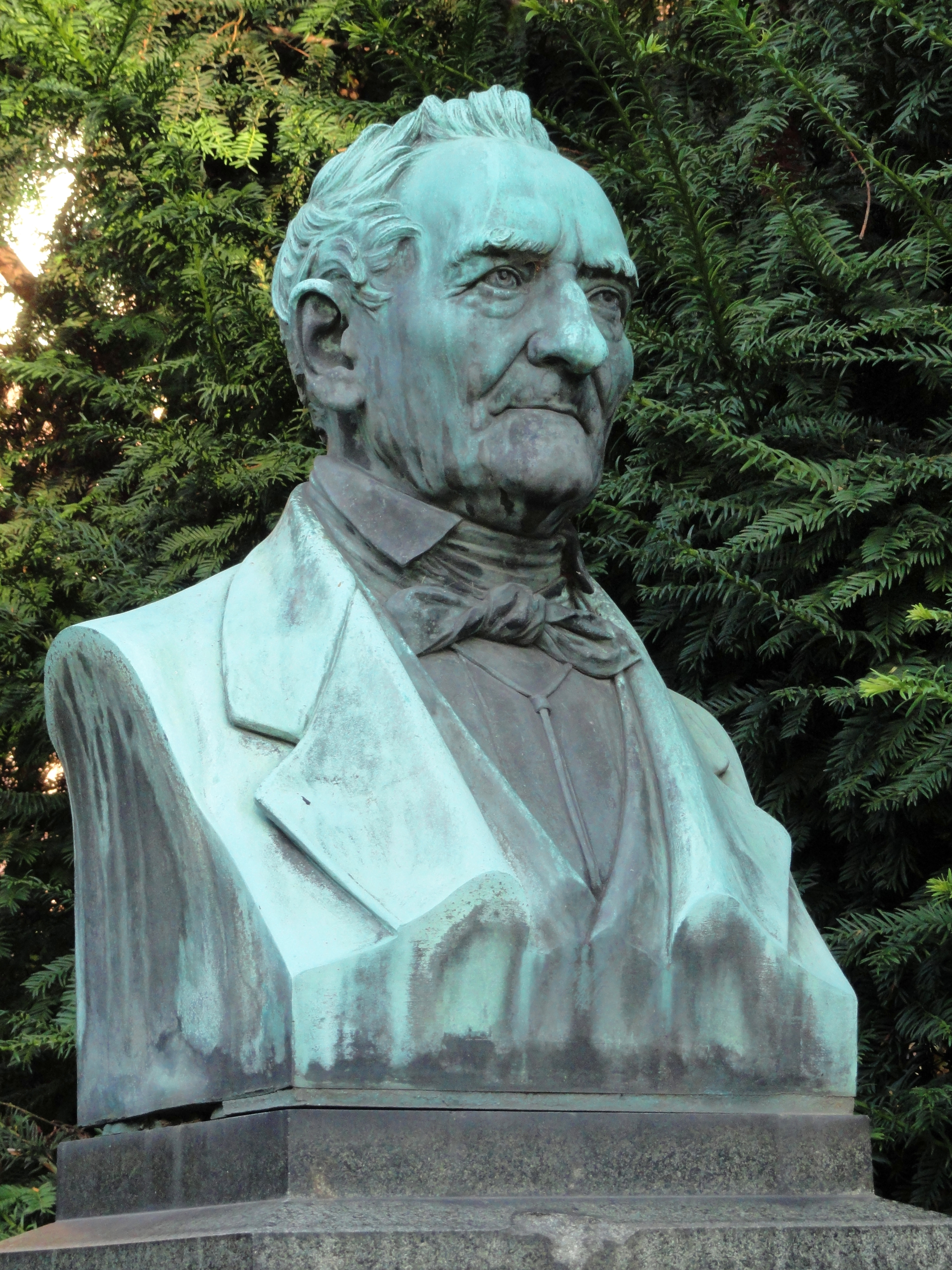
- Bronze bust in front of the Physics Institute, Frankfurt am Main
- Born: 28 April 1806; Aschersleben, Principality of Halberstadt, Holy Roman Empire
- Died: 29 April 1881 (aged 75); Frankfurt am Main, German Empire
- Education: University of Halle-Wittenberg; University of Jena
- Scientific career
- Workplaces: University of Frankfurt am Main

Rudolf Christian Böttger (28 April 1806 – 29 April 1881) was a German inorganic chemist. He conducted most of his research at the University of Frankfurt am Main. He is credited with discovery of nitrocellulose in 1846, independently to Schönbein, and with the synthesis of the first organocopper compound copper(I) acetylide Cu_{2}C_{2} in 1859.

== Life and work ==
Böttger was born in Aschersleben, Principality of Halberstadt in 1806. After attending the primary school there he joined the school of the Franksche Stiftung in Halle an der Saale at the age of eleven. In 1824, Böttger started to study theology, but in parallel also attended the science lectures at the University Halle. The lectures of Johann Salomo Christoph Schweigger had a strong influence on him. Böttger left the university in 1828 and worked as cleric and teacher at different locations. The contact with Schweigger never faded and in 1831 Böttger decided to leave the theology career. He was offered a job at the voluntary association for chemistry in Frankfurt in 1835. His first major work in Frankfurt was the improvement of the electrotyping method for the production of printing plates, he created the first practical nickel electroplating solution (1840). Böttger received his PhD from the University of Jena in 1837 and was appointed as full professor in Frankfurt in 1842. Böttger married Christiane Harpke in 1841, and they had eight children. He and Christian Friedrich Schönbein, a German-Swiss chemist, discovered nitrocellulose independently in 1846. Both scientists collaborated to earn money with the invention, but they were not successful. The development of the safety match in 1848 and the synthesis of the first organocopper compound, the explosive copper(I) acetylide Cu_{2}C_{2} in 1859 were examples for his chemistry research. Böttger stayed at the University of Frankfurt am Main for the rest of his life, although he was offered positions at other universities. He died of a liver illness in 1881.

== Sources ==
- Di Bari, George A. (14 February 2011). "Electrodeposition of nickel" (PDF). In Mordechay Schlesinger; Milan Paunovic (eds.). Modern Electroplating (5 ed.). John Wiley & Sons. pp. 79–114. ISBN 978-1-118-06314-9. OCLC 1037918105.
