= Leyden papyrus X =

Papyrus codex written in Greek

The Leyden papyrus X (P. Leyden X) is a papyrus codex written in Greek at about the end of the 3rd century A.D. or perhaps around 250 A.D. and buried with its owner, and today preserved at Leiden University in the Netherlands.

== Origin ==
The Leiden papyrus was discovered at Thebes in Egypt, together with the Stockholm Papyrus, which was probably written by the same scribe, and many Greek magical papyri, in the early 19th century by an adventurer calling himself Jean d'Anastasi, holding the office of Swedish vice-consul in Alexandria. In 1828 he sold a number of papyri to the Dutch government, which were lodged at the Leiden University Library, and labelled alphabetically from A to Z.

The papyri were first published and translated into Latin by Conrad Leemans in 1885 (Papyri graeci musei antiquarii publici Lugduni Batavi). Papyri A to U relate to matters concerning Ancient Egyptian law. Papyri V, W and X deal with alchemy.

== Papyrus W ==
Papyrus W contains magical invocations and Judaeo-Gnostic content. The 7 perfumes are given as: styrax dedicated to Saturn, malabathrum to Jupiter, costus to Mars, frankincense to the Sun, nard to Venus, cassia to Hermes, myrrh to the Moon. The 7 flowers are: nard, marjoram, lily, lotus, buttercup, narcissus, white violet.

== Papyrus X ==
The papyrus consists of 10 leaves, 30 x 34 cm in size, folded lengthwise and making 20 pages, of which 16 contain writing. Each page has 28-47 lines. The text contains one hundred and eleven recipes for extracting precious metals, or counterfeiting such metals, or precious stones and purple dye. It also contains details of the manufacture of textiles, and making gold and silver inks. The recipes are not detailed, and probably served as a memory aid for those already familiar with the process. The presentation is exclusively practical, and does not include the usual alchemical or philosophical elements. The last eleven recipes are simply short extracts from the Materia Medica of Pedanius Dioscorides. They are chiefly descriptions of certain minerals.

== Bibliography ==
- Robert Halleux: Papyrus de Leyden, papyrus de Stockholm, fragments de recettes. Texte établi et traduction. Les Belles Lettres, Paris 1981 (= Les alchimistes grecs, 1), ISBN 2-251-00003-8.
- Conrad Leemans: Papyri graeci Musei antiquarii publici Lugduni-Batavi, vol. 2, Leiden 1885, p. 199 f.
- Earle Radcliffe Caley: The Leyden papyrus X: an English translation with brief notes. In: Journal of Chemical Education Vol. 3, No. 10 (October 1926), p. 1149-1166.
- Leslie Bernard Hunt: The Oldest Metallurgical Handbook: Recipes of a Fourth Century Goldsmith. In: Gold Bulletin 9 (1976), S. 24-31
- C. Raub: How to coat objects with gold - Pliny, Leyden Papyrus X, Mappae Clavicula and Theophilus seen with a modern chemist's eyes. In: Christiane Eluère (Hrsg.), Outils et ateliers d'orfèvres des temps ancien, Société des Amis du Musée des Antiquités Nationales et du Château de Saint-Germain-en-Laye, Saint-Germain-en-Laye 1993 (= Antiquités nationales mémoire, 2), S. 101-110
- Arie Wallert: Alchemy and medieval art technology. In: Zweder R. von Martels (Hrsg.), Alchemy Revisited: Proceedings of the International Conference on the History of Alchemy at the University of Groningen 17–19 April 1989, Brill, Leiden [u.a.] 1990 (= Collection de travaux de l'Académie Internationale d'Histoire des Sciences, 33), ISBN 90-04-09287-0, S. 154-161
