= List of equipment of the Slovak Ground Forces =

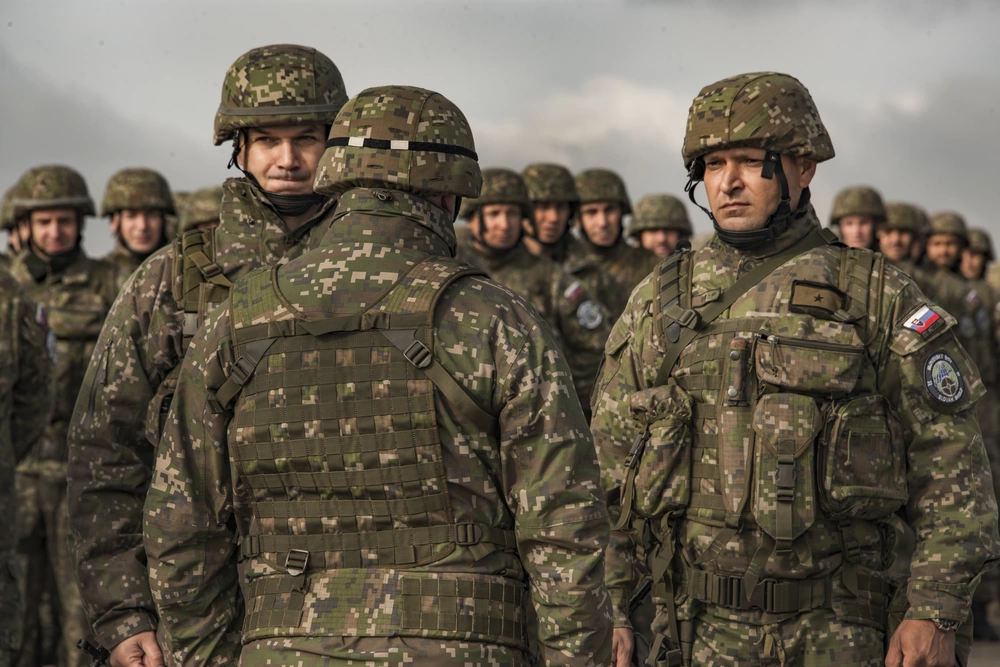
A group of Slovak Army soldiers receive a report from their comrade during the opening ceremony of Slovak Shield 2018 at Lešť Military Training Center.

== Infantry equipment ==
The equipment of the Slovak Land Forces soldiers includes:

- Vzor 2007 Woodland uniform (Slovak digital camouflage pattern)
- Vzor 25 Woodland uniform (Slovak MultiCam style camouflage pattern should enter service in early 2026)
- Slovak modular load-bearing system
- New load-bearing equipment, mainly plate carriers
- Ops Core Fast helmet
- Šestan-Busch BK-ACH-HC new balistic helmet high cut type (10,000 units purchased and an option for an additional 10,000 units )
- Night vision devices
- Communication devices
- M-2000 gas mask

== Infantry weapons ==
=== Knives ===
Model	Image	Origin	Type	Quantity	Note
Vz. 58 Bayonet		Czechoslovakia	Bayonet	25,000	Standard bayonet for Vz. 58.
Vz.75		Czechoslovakia	Combat knife	25,000	Modernised version in use as a standard-issue knife.
M7 bayonet		United States	Bayonet	5,000	5,000 bayonets bought with 5,000 M4 rifles.
GP M4M bayonet		Slovakia	Bayonet	23,000	M4-style bayonet for new service rifles.

=== Firearms ===
==== Pistols ====
Model	Image	Origin	Variant	Caliber	Details
ČZ vz. 82		Czechoslovakia	—	9×18mm	Standard service pistol, will be replaced by Q1 pistol.
GP Q1		Slovakia	Q1/Q1S	9×19mm Parabellum	Future standard service pistol. The first pistols are expected to be handed to the soldiers in 2026.
CZ P-09		Czech Republic	CZ-09 S	9×19mm Parabellum	8,400 pistols bought in 2015.
CZ 75		Czech Republic	—	9×19mm Parabellum	688 bought along with CZ 805 BREN.
Glock 17		Austria	17/Gen 4	9×19mm Parabellum	Used by 5th Special Operations Regiment.

==== Submachine guns ====
Model	Image	Origin	Variant	Caliber	Details
Heckler & Koch MP5		West Germany	MP5A3	9×19mm Parabellum	Only used by the 5th Special Forces Regiment.
STRIBOG AP9 A3		Slovakia	A3	9×19mm Parabellum	New personal defense weapon, should enter service in 2026.
Heckler & Koch UMP		Germany	UMP9	9×19mm Parabellum	Used by the 5th Special Forces Regiment and military police.

==== Assault rifles ====
Model	Image	Origin	Variant	Caliber	Details
vz. 58		Czechoslovakia	vz. 58 V vz. 58 P vz. 58 VM vz. 58 Pi	7.62×39mm	Standard service assault rifle of Slovak Army.; (It will be fully replaced by the Grand Power M4M1 by 2028)
GP M4M1		Slovakia	M4M1	5.56×45mm NATO	New standard issue rifle, will completely phase out Vz. 58, CZ 805 BREN and M4 rifles.; The first rifles should be delivered to the soldiers in next year and the deliveries should be completed in 2028.; After the completion of deliveries, the army will be fielding 26,139 M4M1 rifles in 14,5 inch barrel and in 11 inch barrel.
Colt M4		United States	M4A1	5.56×45mm NATO	Slovakia announced purchase via FMS program in 2017 (+5,000 ordered).
CZ 805 BREN		Czech Republic	CZ 805A1	5.56×45mm NATO	654 in service.; 688 initially ordered in 2015.; It will be transferred to the reserves in favour of the GP M4M.
HK416		Germany	HK 416A4 HK 417	5.56×45mm NATO	276 in use with 5th Special Forces Regiment.
Vz. 52		Czechoslovakia	vz. 52/57	7.62×39mm	Used by Honour Guard of the President.

==== Sniper rifles ====
Model	Image	Origin	Variant	Caliber	Details
SVD		Soviet Union	OPu SVDN 1	7.62×54mmR	Standard designated marksman rifle of the Slovak Army.
R10		Slovakia	_	7.62×51mm NATO	New standard issue designated marksman rifle of the Slovak Army.
AW.50		United Kingdom	MK2	12.7×99mm NATO	-
Barrett M82		United States	M82	12.7×99mm NATO	Used by 5th Special Operations Regiment.

==== Machine guns ====
Model	Image	Origin	Variant	Caliber	Details
FN MINIMI		Belgium	Minimi Para 7.62 Mk3	5.56×45mm NATO 7.62×51mm NATO	Standard light machine gun of Slovak Army. 1600 machine guns ordered in 5.56mm. 30 machines gun in 7.62.
MG 3		West Germany	A1	7.62×51mm NATO	Mounted on Leopard 2A4 tanks.
UK vz. 59		Czechoslovakia	UG vz. 59 L UG. vz 59 T	7.62×54mmR	Gradually replaced by FN Minimi.
FN MAG		Belgium	M60-40	7.62×51mm NATO	Mounted on BOV 8x8 Patria.
M2 Browning		United States	M2A1 M2HB-QCB	12.7×99mm NATO	Standard heavy machine gun of Slovak Army.; M2HB-QCB are mounted on Zuzana 2.

=== Explosives ===
==== Grenades ====
Model	Image	Origin	Type	TNT equivalent	Details
RG-4		Czechoslovakia	Assault hand grenade	0,11 kg TNT	Used mostly for training.
M18		United States	Smoke grenade		Seen in public demonstration.

==== Grenade launchers ====
Model	Image	Origin	Type	Caliber	Details
AGS-17		Soviet Union	Automatic grenade launcher	30×29mm grenade	Standard grenade launcher of the Slovak Ground Forces.; In the future will be replaced by NATO standard grenade launcher.
Mk 19		United States	Automatic grenade launcher	40x53mm HV	Used by 5th Special Operations Regiment.
M203		United States	Underbarrel single shot grenade launcher	40x46mm LV	30 ordered.
CZ 805 G1		Czech Republic	Underbarrel single-shot grenade launcher	40x46mm LV	

==== Anti-tank weapons ====
Model	Image	Origin	Type	Variant	Caliber	Details
RPG-75		Czechoslovakia	Disposable recoilless gun	RPG-Cv-75 RPG-Šk-75	68mm	Standard anti-tank weapon of the Slovak Army.
Carl Gustaf		Sweden	Multi-role recoilless gun	M3 M4	84mm	Can fire various types of munitions.; Slovakia was the first country to operate the Carl Gustaf M4.
RPG-7		Soviet Union	Rocket-propelled grenade launcher	V	85mm	Used by the 1st Mechanized Brigade.
SPIKE		Israel	Anti-tank guided missile	LR2	130mm	10 launchers and 100 missiles are in service.; SPIKE LR2 launchers will also be installed on the BOV 8x8 Patria and the CV90.
9M113 Konkurs		Soviet Union	Anti-tank guided missile		135mm	Used by the 1st Mechanized Brigade.
PT Mi-Ba-III		Czechoslovakia	Anti-tank mine	-	-	8 kg TNT equivalent. Used by engineers.

== Indirect Fire ==
=== Mortars ===
Model	Picture	Origin	Caliber	Quantity	Notes
L16 81mm		United Kingdom; Canada	81mm	-	Used by the 2nd Mechanized Brigade.
vz. 52	-	Czechoslovakia	82mm	-	
vz. 97		Slovakia	98mm	58	

=== Howitzers ===
Model	Picture	Origin	Caliber	Quantity	Notes
Self-propelled howitzers
155 mm SpGH Zuzana 155 mm SpGH Zuzana 2		Slovakia	155mm	16 19	- Ordered in 2018, the last 6 were to be delivered by the end of 2022. However, due to the Russian Invasion of Ukraine, the delivery has been postponed. 19 were delivered, but it is unknown whether the remaining 6 Zuzana 2's were delivered.
155 mm SpGH EVA M3		Slovakia	155mm	0/16	The Ministry of Defence showed interest in replacing the Zuzana vz. 2000 with newer artillery systems which are based on a 6x6 chassis. Overall, the EVA M3 is lighter and faster. In December 2025, there was an official order for 16 EVA M3 6x6 howitzers.
Towed howitzers
D-30		Soviet Union	122mm	9	Used only as a ceremonial howitzer. More were sold to Afghanistan.

=== Rocket Artillery ===
Model	Picture	Origin	Caliber	Quantity	Notes
Multiple rocket launcher
RM-70/85 Modular		Czechoslovakia	227mm 122mm	25	As of February 2026, Slovakia has 25 RM-70/85 Modulars in service.

== Armoured combat vehicles ==
Model	Picture	Origin	Type	Quantity	Notes
Leopard 2A4		West Germany	Main battle tank	15	Delivered by Germany after Slovakia sent 30 BVP-1s to Ukraine.
T-72M1		Soviet Union	Main battle tank	30	Inherited from Czechoslovakia.; Standard main battle tank of the Slovak Army.
Infantry fighting vehicles
CV 9035 Mk IV		Sweden; Slovakia; Czech Republic	Infantry fighting vehicle Reconnaissance Command post Armoured recovery Armoured engineering	0/152	The Slovak Government signed off on the decision to procure 152 CV90 Mk IV armed with a 35mm Bushmaster III cannon, on 28 June 2022.; Will be equipped with the Iron Fist active protection system.
BOV 8x8 Patria		Finland; Slovakia	Infantry fighting vehicle Command Post Armoured ambulance	0/62-64 0/6 10	All should be delivered by 2027.; Delays have slowed deliveries down significantly, but are slowly recovering, 15 IFV vehicles were built and tested but are awaiting the installation of the turret.; As compensation for the delays and problems with delivery, the Slovak Minister of Defence managed to negotiate a few extra vehicles (most likely four). (Note: Form of Compensation: Prior to the contract amendment between Patria and the Ministry of Defence on 16 June 2026, the number of vehicles was expected to be 3.; However, according to other sources like Pravda which were published after, the compensation would be in the form of 2 vehicles along with a budget for spare parts and improvements, and after the contract amendement, a further two vehicles will be provided as a "discount" therefore, a total of 4 vehicles.); In June 2026, all Patria AMBS vehicles (10) were delivered to Slovakia.
BVP-1		Czechoslovakia Soviet Union	Infantry fighting vehicle	73	Inherited from Czechoslovakia.; 206 in storage (mobilization stocks).; Will be replaced by CV90.; 30 BVP-1s from storage were sent to Ukraine.
BVP-2		Czechoslovakia Soviet Union	Infantry fighting vehicle	90	Inherited from Czechoslovakia.; Standard infantry fighting vehicle of the Slovak army.; Will be replaced by CV90.
BVP-M		Slovakia	Infantry fighting vehicle	17	17 vehicles were modernized.
Armoured personnel carrier
OT-90		Czechoslovakia	Armoured personnel carrier	60	The primary armoured personnel carrier of the Slovak army.; Will be replaced by BOV 8x8 Patria.
Tatrapan		Slovakia	Armoured personnel carrier Command post Armoured ambulance	60	Tatrapan Zasa – personnel carrier Tatrapan AMB – ambulance version Tatrapan VSRV – command post vehicle
BPsVI		Slovakia	Reconnaissance vehicle	18	Upgraded BPzV Svatava, in service with the Slovak Ground Forces since 2018.
Armoured cars and light tactical vehicles
Humvee		United States	Armored car	6	Purchased from the United States during deployment in Afghanistan. Mostly used by the 5th Special Forces Regiment.
M1278 JLTV		United States	Infantry mobility vehicle	0/110 1/50	In total, Slovakia ordered 160 units of the M1278A1/A2 Heavy Gun Carrier variant. (Note: JLTV Acquisition: Slovakia decided to order JLTVs after the United States approved a grant worth $200 million to modernize the Slovak Armed Forces.; The Slovak Ministry of Defence originally wanted to acquire 192 vehicles, but due to the increased cost of all additional equipment only 160 vehicles could be acquired with just the money from the US grant.); 110 are equipped with a M153 CROWS turret, while the other 50 are equipped with a crewed turret.; Deliveries began right in January 2026, and have continued since, with one vehicle being presented at IDEB 2026, and the others being stored in a logistical center.; They are being modified in Slovakia before entering service.
Iveco LMV		Italy	Infantry mobility vehicle CBRN	10	Ordered in 2009, delivered in May 2010.; Used by the 5th Special Forces Regiment.
Aligator 4x4		Slovakia	Infantry mobility vehicle CBRN Reconnaissance Command post	42	_
9P148 BRDM-2		Soviet Union	Tank destroyer	_	ATGM launcher vehicle with 5 wire-guided 9M113 Konkurs.; Used by the 1st Mechanized Brigade.

== Surveillance and communication systems ==
Name	Photo	Origin	Type	Note
L3Harris		United States	Communications system	It is not known what exact system is in the army's arsenal.
RF-10		Czechoslovakia	Radio station	Very small quantities in service.

=== Communication vehicles ===
Name	Photo	Origin	Type	Quantity	Note
Tatrapan VSRS		Slovakia	Mobile command and radio transmission vehicle	12	VHF and HF radio stations: WPNR broadband radio station; routers and switches; network server; rugged computing; Wi-Fi system
RG-32M		South Africa	Transmission communication	7	Part of the MOKYS system.
MAN HX MOKYS		Slovakia; Germany	Communication hub	10	Modified version used as part of Slovak army communication system MOKYS.

== Logistic, utility and engineering vehicles ==
Model	Picture	Origin	Type	Quantity	Notes
Ambulances
Mercedes-Benz G-300		Germany	Military ambulance	3	_
Volkswagen Transporter (T4)		Germany	Military ambulance	~30	_
Light utility vehicles
Land Rover Defender 110 SW		United Kingdom; Slovakia	Utility vehicle CBRN Command and control	170+	Standard light vehicle of Slovak army.
Mercedes-Benz G-Class		Germany; Austria	Utility vehicle	20-30	Used by 5th Special Operations Regiment. Deployed in KFOR.
UAZ-469		Soviet Union	Utility vehicle	~100	Is being replaced by Land Rover Defender and JLTV.
Volkswagen: Touareg; Golf; Caravelle		Germany	SUV	75	
Nissan: Pathfinder; Navara		Japan	SUV	~105	_
Nissan: Pathfinder; Navara		Japan	SUV	86	
Mercedes-Benz V-Class		Germany	Minivan	104	Used for logistics.
All-terrain vehicles
CFMoto Gladiator		Slovakia	All-terrain vehicle	3	In use by the military police.
Polaris RZR		United States	All-terrain vehicle	18	9 Can–Am BRP on order. Used by 5th Special Forces Regiment.
Pickup truck	-	Slovakia	Pickup truck	102	Unspecified pickup cars bought from Slovak company Todos Bratislava for 4.2 million euros.
Logistic trucks
Tatra T-815		Czechoslovakia	Military heavy truck	800+	6x6, 8x8, 10x10 versions, platform for fuel tanker, multifit, crane, recovery vehicle, bridge vehicle, etc.
Tatra 815-7		Czech Republic	Military heavy truck	100+	More ordered.
AKTIS 4x4 1R-08		Austria; Germany; Slovakia	Military medium truck	169	169 in service as of 2015.; Based on MAN TGM.; More ordered.
AKTIS 4x4 1R VV		Slovakia	Military medium truck	100	Based on Steyr 12M21
MAN HX		Germany	Military truck	20	20 MAN HX container carrier trucks were delivered in September 2012.
Praga V3S		Czechoslovakia	Military medium truck	~300	Will be replaced by AKTIS and Tatra 815-7.
Engineering vehicles
VPV		Czechoslovakia	Armoured recovery vehicle	_	Will be replaced by CV 90 recovery variant.
AV-15		Czechoslovakia	Recovery vehicle	_	_
UDS Universal Excavators		Slovakia	Excavator	_	Used in Iraq.
AM 50		Czechoslovakia	Armoured vehicle-launched bridge	_	_
MT-55A		Czechoslovakia; Soviet Union	Armoured vehicle-launched bridge	19	_
PM-55		Czechoslovakia	Armoured vehicle-launched bridge	_	_
PMS-815		Czechoslovakia	Pontoon bridger	_	_
RUSB	_	Germany	Military engineering boats	~2	Used by engineers.
PTS		Soviet Union	Amphibious vehicle	15	
UOS 155 Belarty	-	Slovak Republic	Demining, combat engineering vehicle	_	Based on a T-55 chassis.
MU-90		Czechoslovakia	Minelayer	_	Minelaying vehicle based on BVP-1 with around 110 mines available in it.
AMB-S		Czechoslovakia	Armored ambulance	10	Based on BVP-1, will be replaced by Patria AMBS.
Božena : Božena 3; Božena 4; Božena 5		Slovak Republic	Demining mechanical clearance	25	Remote-controlled self-propelled mine roller.
SVO A1	-	Slovak Republic	Demining mechanical clearance	_	Self-propelled mine-clearing charges launching system. Based on a BVP-1 chassis.
Retriever	-	Slovak Republic	Demining robot	_	
Scorpion	-	Slovak Republic	Unmanned ground vehicle	_	
Combat rubber raiding craft		United States	Inflatable boat	3	Used by special forces.

=== Army Medical Equipment ===
Name	Image	Origin	Type	Number	Note
Role 2E Army Field Hospital		United States	Field hospital	2~	Bought in early 2000s.
Role 2B		United States	Battalion Dressing center	1	

== Proposed, in negotiation purchases ==
Name	Possibility	Photo	Origin	Type	Quantity	Notes
MANPAD	Piorun		Poland	Man-portable air-defense system	54	Should replace 9K38 Igla. Estimated price is €90 million. Estimated more orders in some stages.
Tank	CV90120 CFL-120 Karpat		Sweden Slovakia Czech Republic Turkey	Light/Medium tank	104 or more	The Ministry of Defense was evaluating three potential ways to strengthen its mechanized brigades: acquiring 104 new Leopard 2A8 tanks or a combination of 52 or more Leopard 2A4 tanks supplemented with lighter CV90120 tanks or last option a procurement of a Polish version of the K2 Black Panther (K2PL) which Slovakia was negotiating with the Polish government. The Leopard 2A8 and the K2PL were dropped out of the tendre in favour of the CV90120 or the newly revealed CFL-120 Karpat.
4x4 Light Armoured Vehicle	Zetor Gerlach Patriot II Deftech Hron		Slovakia Czech Republic	Infantry mobility vehicle	400	The Ministry of Defence intends to purchase 4x4 vehicles (Patriot II, Zetor Gerlach, Deftech Wolf). The Slovak Armed Forces procured three pieces from each manufacturer, each in a different configuration, which are intended for testing. The Slovak Armed Forces would later like to procure 400 vehicles and that is not the final number, which they would like to acquire.
Military truck	Tatra 815-7		NATO; Slovakia	Utility truck	1295	The joint procurement of military equipment with the neighboring Czech Republic would allow the army to acquire more than 1,295 new vehicles - 6x6 flatbed platforms and 8x8 hook loaders. The estimated price is over 708 million euros.

As a part of the Armed Forces' modernization, the Slovak Armed Forces plan to procure up to 500 BOV 8x8 Patria vehicles in their long-term development plans with the first phase of 76 vehicles having already been ordered and some delivered.

=== HIMARS procurement ===
In 2026, the Ministry of Defence proposed the purchase of the M142 HIMARS system. The PrSM will most likely be purchased.

=== Drone purchases ===
Slovakia has started discussions on the purchase of drones, it is assumed that Israel has also submitted an offer to purchase Polish drones. There are also plans to buy drones from the Turkish manufacturer Baykar.

=== Other modernization projects ===
The ministry announced the construction of a new military hospital in Prešov. Also, the new chemko Staržske armory for the production of powder cartridges for large-caliber ammunition. A new line for 155mm artillery ammunition will be added in Snina for 360,000 pieces. Missiles for the Barak MX will be assembled at VOP Nováky. It will not be the production location, only the assembly from imported components.

Construction of underground facilities for long term storage of various interceptors used in Barak MX system for 50 million euros should start this year.

The building of the Ministry of Defence was modernized in Bratislava and military infrastructure in Trebišov is also being rebuilt.

== Stored and retired equipment ==
Model	Image	Type	Origin	Number	Detail
82mm vz. 59A		Recoilless rifle	Czechoslovakia	~50	Were retired from active service in late 1990s and early 2000s. Photos indicate it was left in storage after its retirement.
AZP S-60		Anti-Aircraft gun	Soviet Union	Unknown	Unknown if any remain in storage. Thousands of rounds gifted to Ukraine as aid against Russian invasion of Ukraine.
152 mm gun-howitzer D-20		152 mm towed, heavy gun-howitzer	Soviet Union	Unknown	Unknown how they ended up in Slovakia, never entered service, possibly were used for testing during the development of the DANA.
2S1 Gvozdika		122mm Self-propelled artillery	Soviet Union People's Republic of Bulgaria	Unknown	49 brought to service after dissolution of Czechoslovakia. Most of which were gradually being retired from service in years 2000-2005 but some could be still seen in exercises years after. Unknown if any remain in storage.
BVP-1		Infantry fighting vehicle	Soviet Union	206	Many inherited from Czechoslovakia are in storage as mobilization stocks.
