= BOV 8x8 Patria =

BOV 8×8 Patria
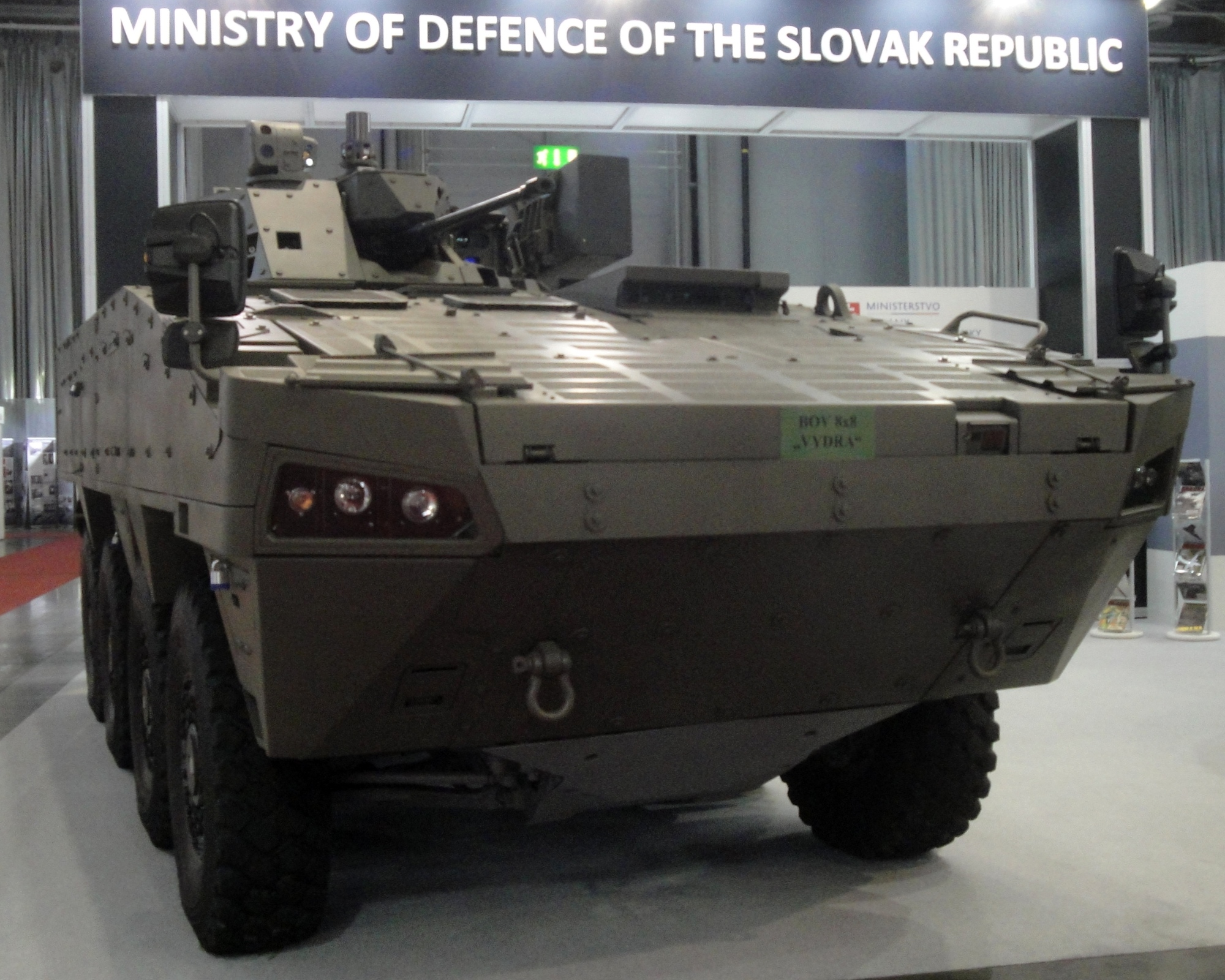
- A BOV 8×8 Vydra at the IDET 2019 exhibition.
- Type: Infantry fighting vehicle
- Place of origin: Finland; Slovakia

Service history
- Used by: Slovakia

Production history
- Developed from: Patria AMV
- Unit cost: 4,7 million €

Specifications
- Mass: 28,000 kg (62,000 lb)
- Length: 8.2 m (27 ft)
- Width: 3.0 m (9.8 ft)
- Height: 3.7 m (12 ft)
- Crew: 3 (commander, driver, gunner); 7 passengers
- Main armament: 1 x 30×173mm GTS-30/N Autocannon
- Secondary armament: 1 x 7.62×51mm NATO FN MAG coaxial general purpose machinegun
- Engine: DI 12 Scania diesel 360 kW (480 hp) or 450 kW (600 hp)
- Power/weight: 16.07 kW/t (21.85 PS/t) (max weight)
- Suspension: 8×8
- Operational range: 700 km (430 mi)
- Maximum speed: over 100 km/h (60 mph) on land up to 8 km/h (5.0 mph) in water

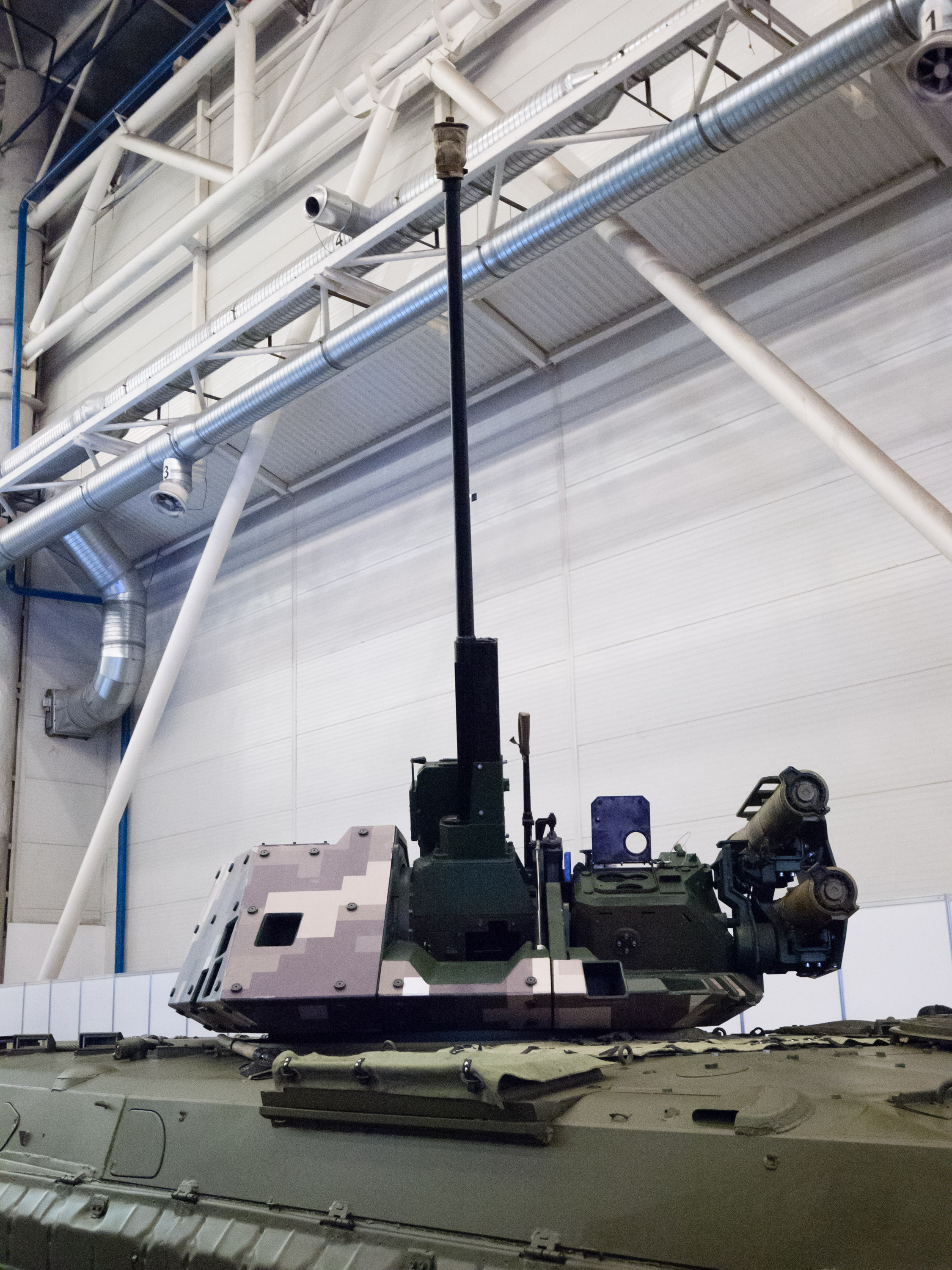
TURRA 30 turret mounted on a BMP-1

The BOV 8×8 Patria (Slovak: Bojové Obrnené Vozidlo 8×8 Patria, lit. 'Patria 8×8 Armoured fighting vehicle') is an 8×8 multi-role military vehicle produced by Patria, Konštrukta – Defence, in Dubnica nad Váhom in cooperation with DMD Group and ZTS Špeciál. The vehicle is a licensed variant of the Finnish Patria AMV^{XP}.

== History ==
=== Previous projects ===
The Slovak Ministry of Defence already wanted to buy 8×8 vehicles in 2015. The first 8×8 vehicle was meant to be based on the KTO Rosomak, and not on the original Patria AMV platform. The vehicle was designed by the Polish Armaments Group and Slovak company ZTS Špeciál, under the name Scipio. Slovakia wanted to buy around 30 of these vehicles, but due to financial reasons the project was cancelled.

Then again in 2017, the government started a procurement of an 8×8 platform, which is till today is known as one of the least transparent procurements in Slovak history. The vehicle carried the name BOV 8×8 Vydra. However, after the elections, the new Minister of Defence Jaroslav Naď completely rejected the procurement of the BOV Vydra in 2019. Then in 2022, the Ministry of Defence under Jaroslav Naď started a tendre in which the Patria AMV^{XP} won. The BOV Patria has many similarities with its predecessor but, the main difference being the greater protection due to the improved armor. Additionally, a NATO compatible caliber cannon and also the fact that the old Vydra was based on Patria AMV while the BOV Patria is based on the newer Patria AMV^{XP} are some other differences between the two.

=== Orders and service ===
In August 2022, the Slovak Minister of Defence Jaroslav Naď signed a contract to buy 76 Patria AMV^{XP} vehicles, that are being partly manufactured in Slovakia. Main competitors of the Patria AMV^{XP} were the Pandur II and Mowag Piranha V. In the original order, Slovakia bought 60 infantry fighting vehicles, 10 ambulance vehicles and 6 command and control vehicles. All vehicles are to be delivered between 2025 and 2027.

The BOV 8×8 Patria will replace outdated Soviet era BMP-1s and OT-90s that serve in the 2nd Mechanized Brigade of the Slovak Ground Forces.

=== Production delays ===
The whole program has been massively delayed. The supply chain includes multiple Slovak companies, with many of their products relying on each other.

In the case of the BOV 8×8 Patria, CSM Industry manufactures and tests the vehicle hulls, ZTS Špeciál builds and provides the cannon, which is then mounted on an EVPÚ TURRA 30 turret, with Patria providing all the components that are not built in Slovakia, and Konštrukta-Defence oversees the whole project and additionally mounts the TURRA 30 turret with the GTS-30/N onto the hull.

Although the first 18 vehicle hulls have been built and tested, the whole program is at a standstill due to supposed problems with the cannon. Even the original 2A42 cannon that the GTS-30/N is developed from was known to be inaccurate, and after adapting it to use NATO ammunition it's possible that the accuracy could have worsened further. The problem with the cannon's accuracy was discovered by Patria in firing tests of the first IFV variant.

The delays haven't impacted the ambulance variants as much, as the final BOV 8×8 AMBS vehicles were delivered in June 2026.

== Armament ==
The BOV 8×8 Patria is armed with a Slovak derivative of the Shipunov 2A42 named GTS-30/N which can fire standard NATO 30×173mm caliber coupled with 7.62×51mm NATO FN MAG machine gun and Spike LR missiles .

The cannon and machine gun is installed in the Slovak-made TURRA 30 turret. It uses advanced fire-control systems with thermal sights and an 81mm GALIX or TUČA smoke grenade launcher.

== Variants ==
- BOV 8×8 - Standard infantry fighting vehicle variant that uses a 30 mm caliber cannon and can carry up to seven people.
- BOV 8×8 V - Command and control post version of BOV Patria vehicle, with more advanced communication equipment and less space for carrying troops.
- BOV 8×8 AMBS - Armoured ambulance version with medical equipment. The vehicle comes without the turret and machine gun.

== Future of the vehicle ==
In the long-term development plans, the Slovak Armed Forces plan to procure up to 500 8×8 vehicles. The procurement is divided into five phases. These phases will be implemented gradually between 2022 and 2035.

The first phase has already been implemented. After the completion of every phase, the Slovak Armed Forces should have around 20 variants of the BOV 8×8 Patria in service.

=== Table of all phases with vehicle variants ===
Phase	Vehicle name	Vehicle type	Number of vehicles	In sun
First phase	BOV 8×8	Infantry fighting vehicle	60	76
First phase	BOV 8×8 V	Command and control	6	76
First phase	BOV 8×8 AMBS	Armoured ambulance	10	76
Second phase	BOV 8×8 ER	Electromagnetic disturbance	9	92
Second phase	BOV 8×8 EPZ	Electronic reconnaissance	24	92
Second phase	BOV 8×8 EB	Electromagnetic warfare	3	92
Second phase	BOV 8×8 PVO	Anti-aircraft warfare	56	92
Third phase	BOV 8×8	Infantry fighting vehicle	17	97
Third phase	BOV 8×8 P	Reconnaissance	6	97
Third phase	BOV 8×8 V	Command and control	9	97
Third phase	BOV 8×8 ShM 120	Self-propelled mortar	36	97
Third phase	BOV 8×8 AMBS	Armoured ambulance	29	97
Fourth phase	BOV 8×8 ŠMV	Armoured personnel carrier	81	93
Fourth phase	BOV 8×8 AMP	Anti-materiel rifleman squad	3	93
Fourth phase	BOV 8×8 GM	Grenadier squad	9	93
Fifth phase	BOV 8×8 VOV	Armoured recovery vehicle	13	142
Fifth phase	BOV 8×8 DTP	Technical help plant	11	142
Fifth phase	BOV 8×8 RCHBO	CBRN defense	4	142
Fifth phase	BOV 8×8 RCHBO VPP	CBRN defense search and help	2	142
Fifth phase	BOV 8×8 Ž	Military engineering vehicle	45	142
Fifth phase	BOV 8×8 ŽMV	Minelayer	29	142
Fifth phase	BOV 8×8 ŽVO	Demining mechanical clearance	29	142
Fifth phase	BOV 8×8 ŽČC	Engineering road cleaner	9	142

== Operators ==
=== Current operators ===
Slovakia (10 in service, 66 more on order)
A total of 76 vehicles were ordered in 2022 across three different variants. The three variants ordered were an, infantry fighting vehicle, an ambulance, and a command and control post variant.

=== Deliveries ===
- The first vehicle, an ambulance variant was delivered in September 2025, with all 10 BOV 8×8 AMBS vehicles being delivered to Slovakia in June 2026. This completed the order and delivery of all BOV 8×8 AMBS vehicles that were ordered in the initial phase.

== Technical Data ==
=== Armour protection ===
The basic structure of the vehicle provides protection for every person inside the vehicle according to STANAG 4569 Level 4a/b. (explosion of a 10 kg TNT anti-personnel mine under any wheel or under the floor of the vehicle). The hull of the vehicle is protected according to STANAG 4569 Level 3a/b and the turret is protected according to STANAG 4569 Level 1.

=== Vehicle specifications ===
Vehicle is about 8.2 meters long, around three meters wide and 3.7 meters high. The maximum combat weight of the vehicle is about 28 tonnes and maximum weight for swimming is 25 tonnes.

== See also ==
- Stryker
- LAV III/LAV AFV/LAV-25/ASLAV
- K808 Armored Personnel Carrier
- Boxer
- Freccia IFV
- BTR-90
- Clouded Leopard
- Type 96 armored personnel carrier
- Type 16 maneuver combat vehicle
- Patria AMV
- BTR-4
- Saur 2
- VBCI
- FNSS Pars
- MOWAG Piranha
- TATA Kestrel
