= Zetor Gerlach =

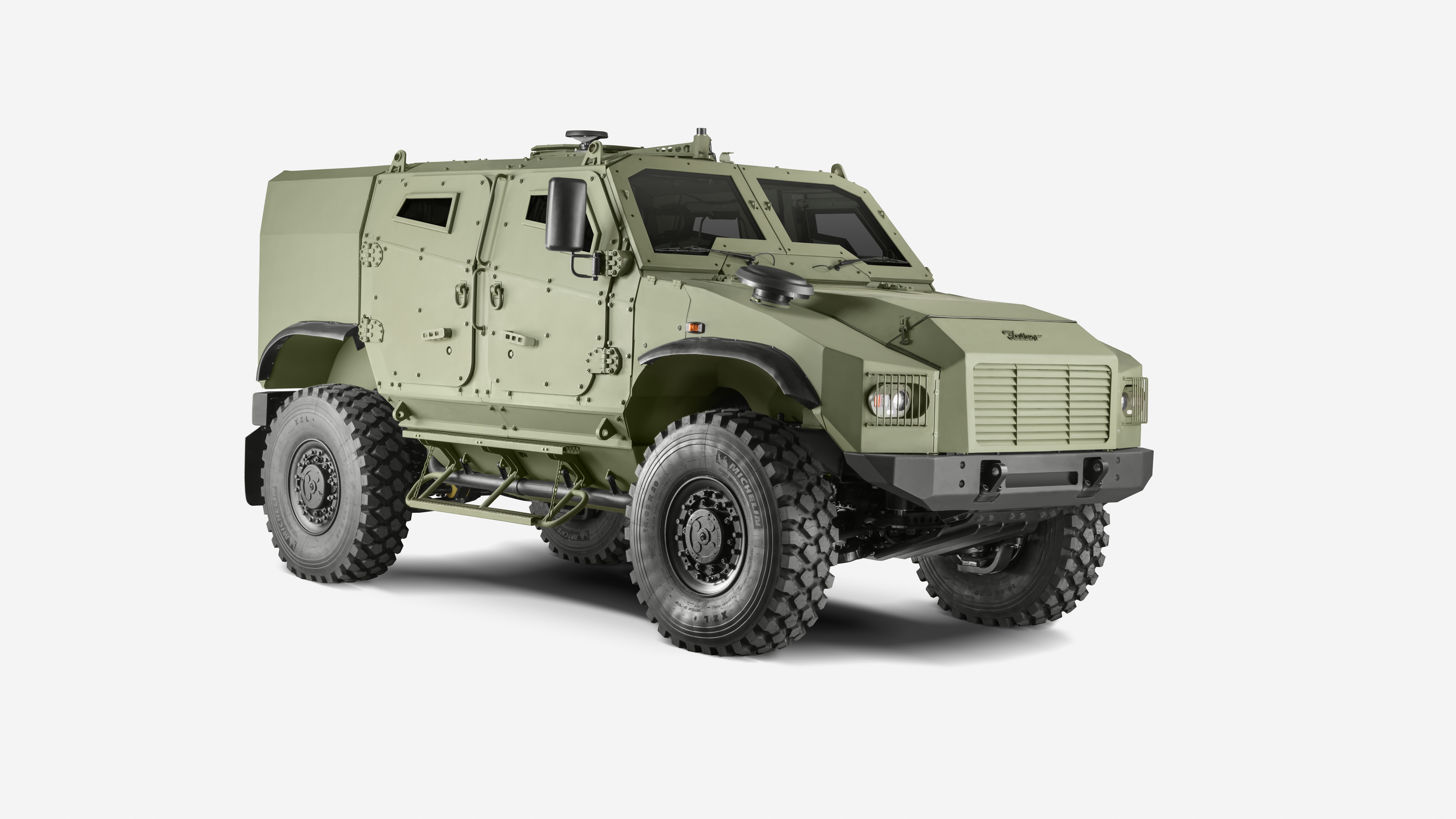
- Zetor Gerlach 4×4
- Type: Lightly armored vehicle
- Place of origin: Slovakia

Service history
- Used by: Slovakia

Production history
- Manufacturer: Zetor Engineering
- Produced: 2026-present

Specifications
- Mass: 12 t
- Length: 5.92 m
- Width: 2.55 m
- Height: 2.60 m
- Crew: 2 + 4
- Armor: STANAG 4569 Level 3a/b
- Engine: 240 kW (326 hp)
- Transmission: 6-speed automatic
- Suspension: Independent suspension
- Maximum speed: 90 km/h

Zetor Gerlach is a lightly armoured 4×4 vehicle developed by Zetor Engineering Slovakia and is named after the highest mountain in Slovakia, Gerlachovský štít. It was presented to the public at IDEB in 2018, and at IDET in Brno in 2019.

In terms of crew protection, Zetor Engineering worked together with Rheinmetall and therefore the Gerlach successfully passed protection tests in line with STANAG 4569 Level 3a/3b. By May 2023, eight prototypes were built, two of which were destroyed in testing. There are three variants of the vehicle, each differing in the number of seats, A, B, C.

== Design ==
The Gerlach is an armoured 4×4 vehicle, consisting of three main sections: the front engine section, the middle section with the armoured cabin, and the rear section with a cargo area of 2.3 m^{3}. As a part of the vehicle's equipment, an unmanned ground vehicle capable of transporting up to 200 kg of cargo can be added.

The cabin has a volume of 7.7 m^{3}, is independently mounted on the chassis and is designed as a pressurized safety capsule, capable of withstanding explosives with a TNT equivalent of up to 8 kg. The cabin provides enough space for a fully-equipped 6-person crew, and in the case of an emergency, the vehicle can accommodate 2 additional crew members, but they will not have seats. It has its own ventilation and filtration system, which gives it the potential ability to operate in contaminated environments. The safety of the crew is strengthened by additional modular armour, a suspension-mounted double floor, and a V-shaped mine protection shield. The seats are specially designed to absorb the dynamic impacts from explosions.

The cargo area can hold up to 1.5 tonnes of equipment, ammunition, fuel cans, etc. The vehicle can also tow up to 28 tonnes.

The rolling chassis of the Zetor allows it to cross trenches up to 0.9 meters wide, overcome obstacles that are half a meter tall, and climb up slopes with an incline of 45 degrees. The chassis' frame design is a part of the protection against mines, with the wheelbase being 3.6 meters and the turning radius 7.5 meters.

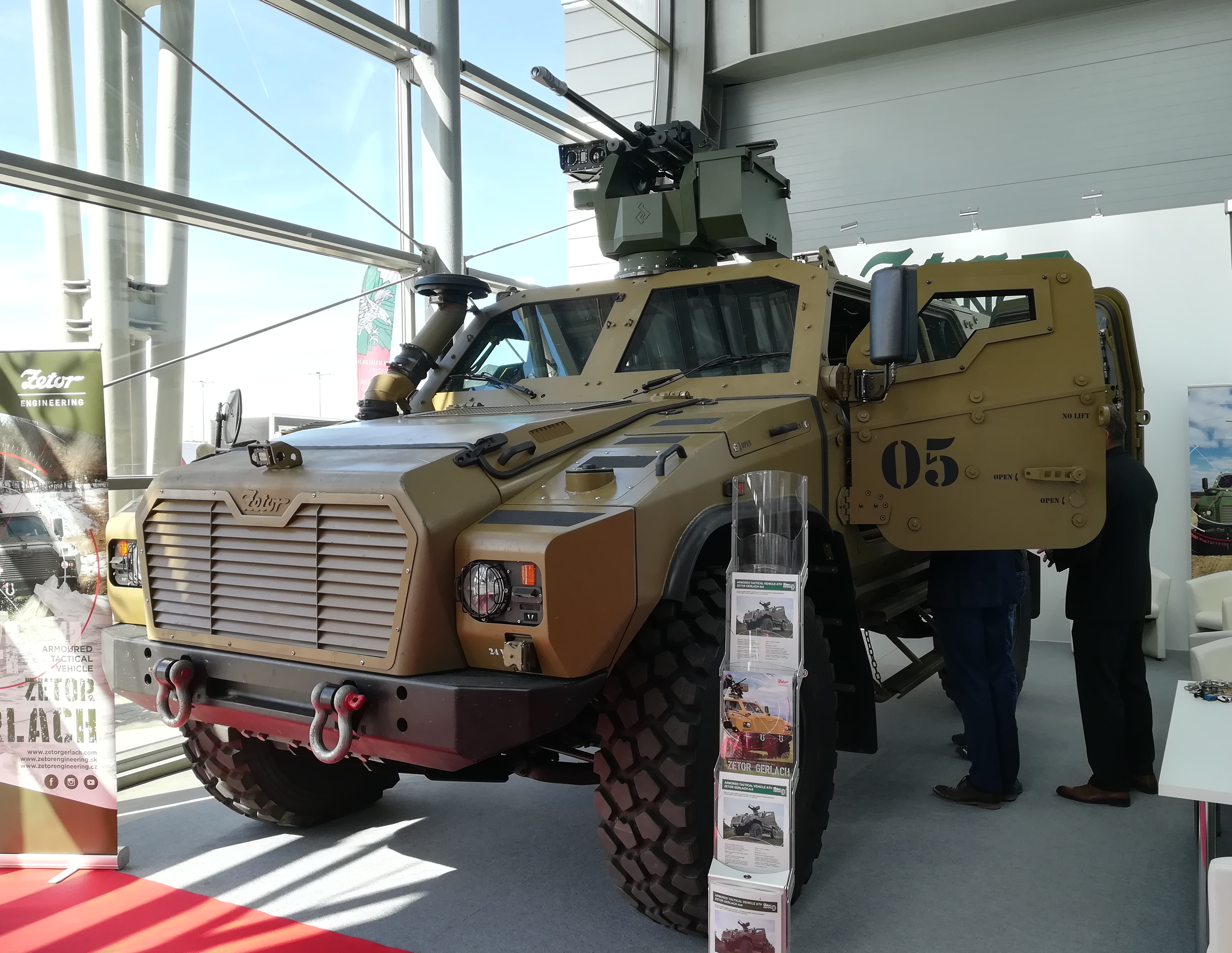
A Zetor Gerlach with a remotely controlled turret

Thanks to the compact design of the vehicle, it can be transported in an Airbus A400M.

== Armament ==
It's possible to install a variety of weapon stations, including mechanically and remotely controlled turrets for grenade launchers, machine guns, mortars, as well as anti-tank guided missiles.

== Operators ==
=== Potential operators ===
Slovakia
The Ministry of Defense ordered three vehicles as a part of its selection of new 4×4 vehicles. If selected, the Slovak Armed Forces will procure around 400 vehicles.
