= PT Mi-Ba-III mine =

Anti-tank mine

The PT Mi-Ba-III is a large Bakelite cased circular Czechoslovak anti-tank blast mine. It is no longer produced but it is found in Angola, Kuwait, Mozambique, and Namibia. A Bulgarian copy of the mine, the PMT-BA-III exists.

== Specifications ==
- Diameter: 330 mm
- Height: 110 mm
- Weight: 10.8 kg
- Explosive content: 8.0 kg of TNT
- Activation force: over 2 kN
- Fuze: RO-2
