= Clouded Leopard Armored Vehicle =

Taiwanese/Irish wheeled fighting vehicle

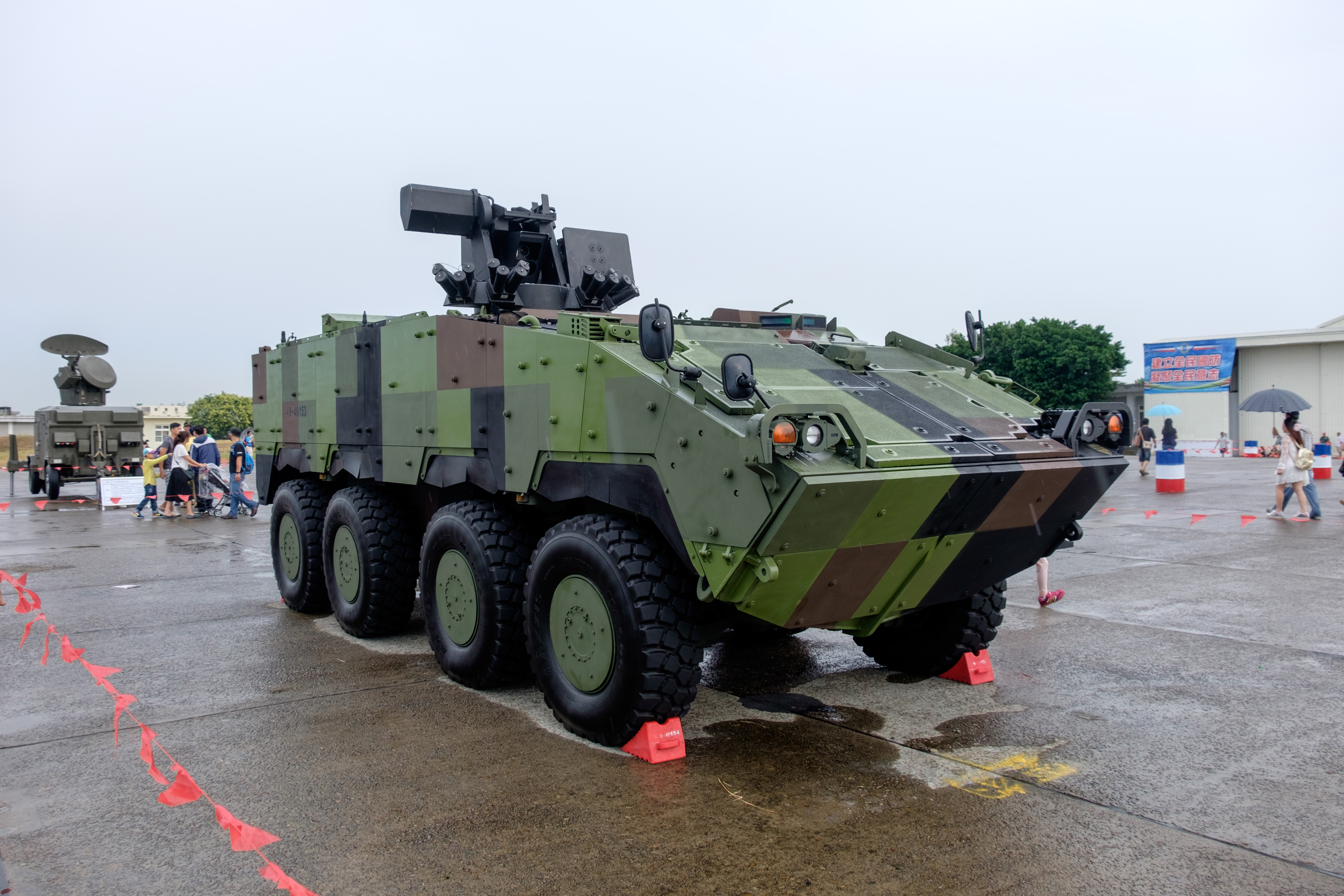
- CM33 armored vehicle
- Type: Armoured fighting vehicle
- Place of origin: Taiwan / Ireland

Production history
- Designer: Ordnance Readiness Development Center
- Designed: 2002
- Manufacturer: Ordnance Readiness Development Center
- Unit cost: US$2 million
- Produced: 2007
- No. built: 378 CM32 and CM33 delivered (2018), 305 CM34 delivered (2023)

Specifications
- Mass: 22 tonnes
- Length: 7 m
- Width: 2.7 m
- Height: 2.23 m
- Crew: 2 + 8 passengers
- Armor: 12.7 mm AP front arc, 7.62 mm AP all around
- Main armament: 30 mm Mk44 Bushmaster II chaingun (CM34) 40 mm automatic grenade launcher (CM32/33) 105 mm rifled gun, or 120 mm mortar (planned)
- Secondary armament: Type 74 7.62 mm machine gun (co-axial)
- Engine: Caterpillar C12 diesel, 450 hp
- Suspension: 8×8 wheeled
- Operational range: 800 km
- Maximum speed: 120 km/h

The Clouded Leopard Eight-Wheeled Armored Vehicle (Chinese: 雲豹八輪甲車; pinyin: yúnbào bā lún jiǎ chē; lit. 'Cloud Leopard Eight-Wheeled Armored Vehicle'), also known as the Taiwan Infantry Fighting Vehicle (TIFV), is a family of eight-wheeled armored vehicle currently being produced for the Republic of China Army (ROCA). It is based on the 6x6 CM31 designed by Timoney Technology Limited of Ireland and is further developed by the Ordnance Readiness Development Center of the ROCA.

According to the Taipei Times, it was named after the Formosan clouded leopard, an indigenous animal, to show that the vehicle is "agile and swift".

== Development ==
Production started in 2007, with an initial order for 600 units. It is estimated that up to 1,400 CM32s may end up being in operational service.

The Delco LAV-25 turret was tested on the first two prototypes but was not adopted on ground of cost and marginal firepower advantage compared to foreign vehicles; instead an indigenous turret armed with a 20 mm T75 revolver cannon was planned in the interest of getting the IFV into service as quickly as possible, and a prototype was demonstrated in 2009. It was hoped that any deficiency in terms of firepower can be alleviated by adopting the cannon to use the Mk 244 Mod 0 APDS ammunition already being ordered by the Republic of China Navy alongside the Phalanx Block 1B weapon systems, but issues with barrel life proved insurmountable, and in the meantime the 30 mm Bushmaster II chaingun was ultimately chosen instead and will be acquired from Orbital ATK. A prototype turret built on this definitive requirement was spotted in May 2015 and unveiled to the public in August 2017.

In 2019 the Ministry of National Defense announced that over the course of the development process 17 shortcomings with the system had been identified and corrected. Shortcomings identified included flaws in the types steel armor, oil leaks, and a lack of interchangeable spare parts. It was discovered that the vehicles had to cover at least 5 km every two weeks to remain in optimal condition.

== Design ==
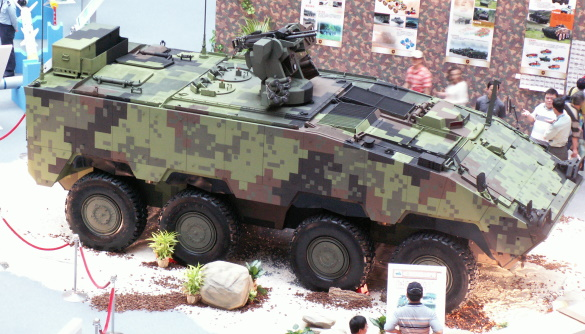
CM32 APC ver.

The project was launched in 2002, at a cost of NT$700 million (US$21.9 million).

The armor of the CM32 provides protection of 7.62 mm AP rounds, while the frontal arc withstands 12.7 mm AP rounds. NBC protection and fire suppression systems are also standard. The V-shaped hull provides protection from landmines and can withstand 12 kg of TNT under any wheel. In its basic APC form the CM32 is armed with a 40 mm automatic grenade launcher and a 7.62 mm co-axial machinegun, both mounted in a remote weapons station.

== Production and service history ==
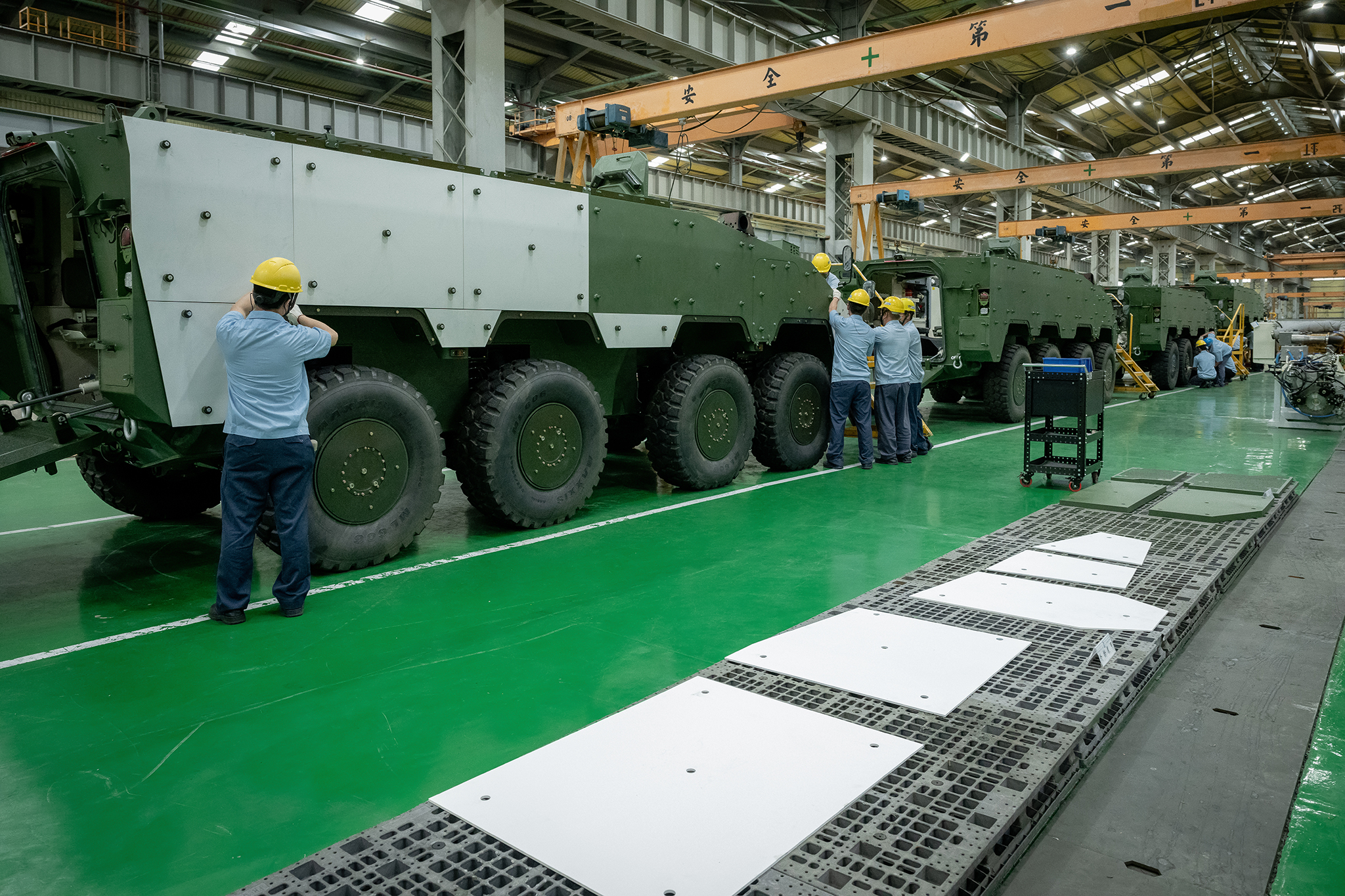
CM32 assembly line at the Ordnance Readiness Development Center

In 2012 Chung-Hsin Electric and Machinery Manufacturing Corp. (CHEM) was awarded the contract for chassis production. CHEM violated their contract by allegedly substituting a number of poor quality Chinese parts in to save money. This affected the first 326 chassis. CHEM's chairman, president, vice president and other officials were found guilty and sentenced to jail time over the scandal in 2021.

Performance records from 2008 to 2018 indicate an engine lifespan of 780,000 km. The type is a regular participant in the Han Kuang Exercises.

== Variants ==
In addition to the infantry carriers, other planned variants include command vehicle, NBC reconnaissance vehicle, mortar carrier (can be configured with either an 81 mm or 120 mm mortar), and assault gun (armed with a 105 mm rifled gun). The Ministry of National Defense is exploring a 155mm self-propelled howitzer based on the CM32.

=== CM31 ===
The CM31 is the 6x6 vehicle prototype in 1992, the design was helped by Timoney Technology Limited of Ireland. However, it was not accepted by the ROC army after testing.

=== CM32 ===
Command vehicle, same armament as CM33. In service as of 2014.

=== CM33 ===
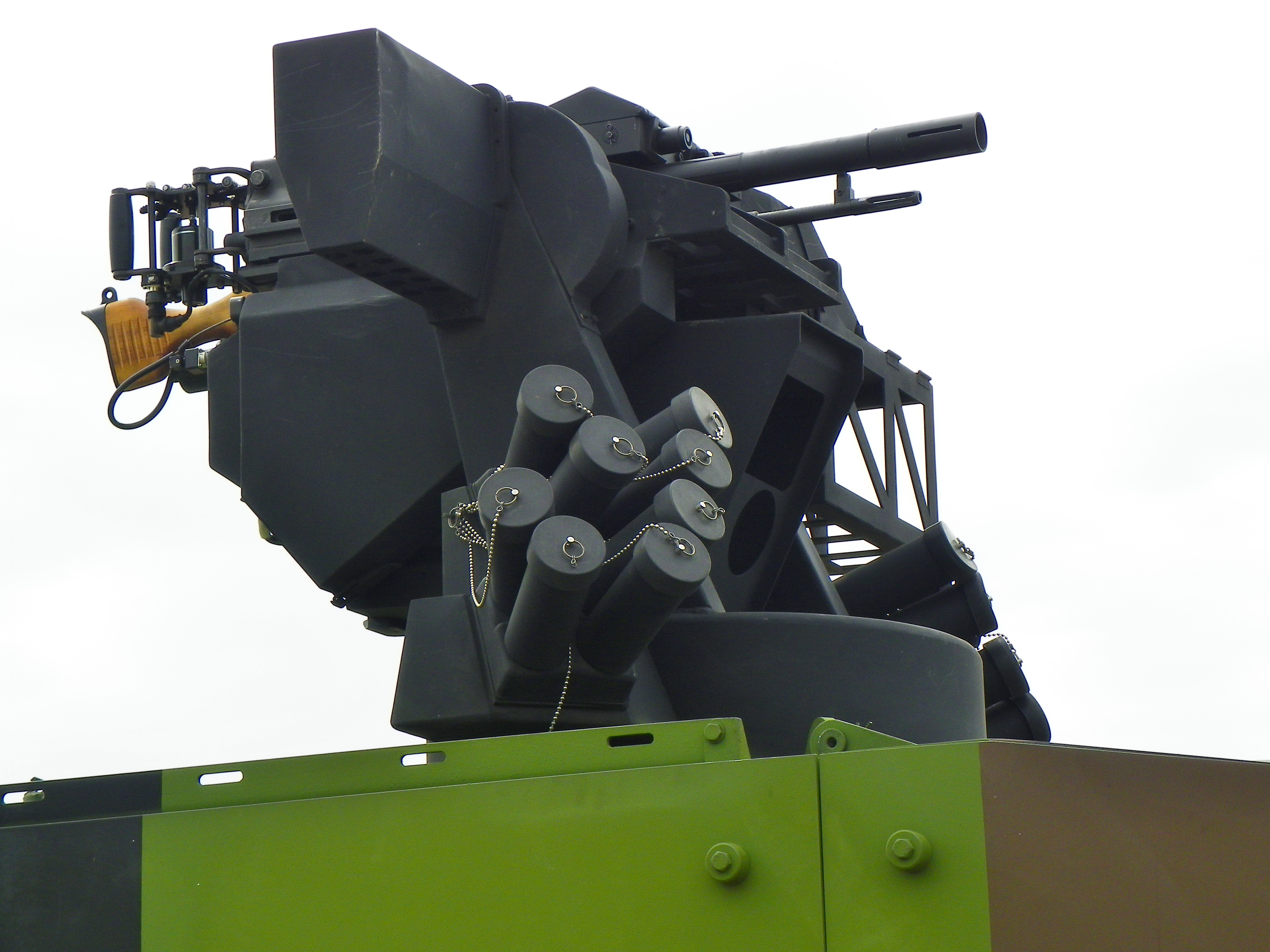
CM32 and CM33 remote weapon station have 40 mm grenade launcher and 7.62mm machine gun mounted

Base variant, with 40 mm grenade launcher and 7.62mm machine gun mounted in a remote weapon station. In service as of 2014. A total of 378 CM32 and CM33 have been produced.

=== CM34 ===
Four prototype vehicles passed primary pre-mass production testing in October 2014.

The CM34 participated, alongside the CM32, in the 35th annual Han Kuang Exercise armed with a Mk44 Bushmaster II. The Taiwanese military expects to produce 284 CM34s. It is in service as of 2019. In August 2020, 21 more vehicles were ordered for the Taiwanese military police.

Taiwanese ceramics manufacturer HCG (和成欣業) will supply the vehicle's ceramic external armor.

=== Cloud Leopard II M2 prototype ===
Taiwan's Ministry of National Defense (MND) exhibited a prototype of the next-generation 8×8 Cloud Leopard II armored vehicle development in public for the first time at the 2019 Taipei Aerospace & Defense Technology Exhibition. It is expected that the prototype will be able to configurate into a mortar carrier platform, a self-propelled howitzer and a fire support platform with a 105 mm gun, similar to U.S Army's M1128 mobile gun system.

== Gallery ==
=== Prototypes ===
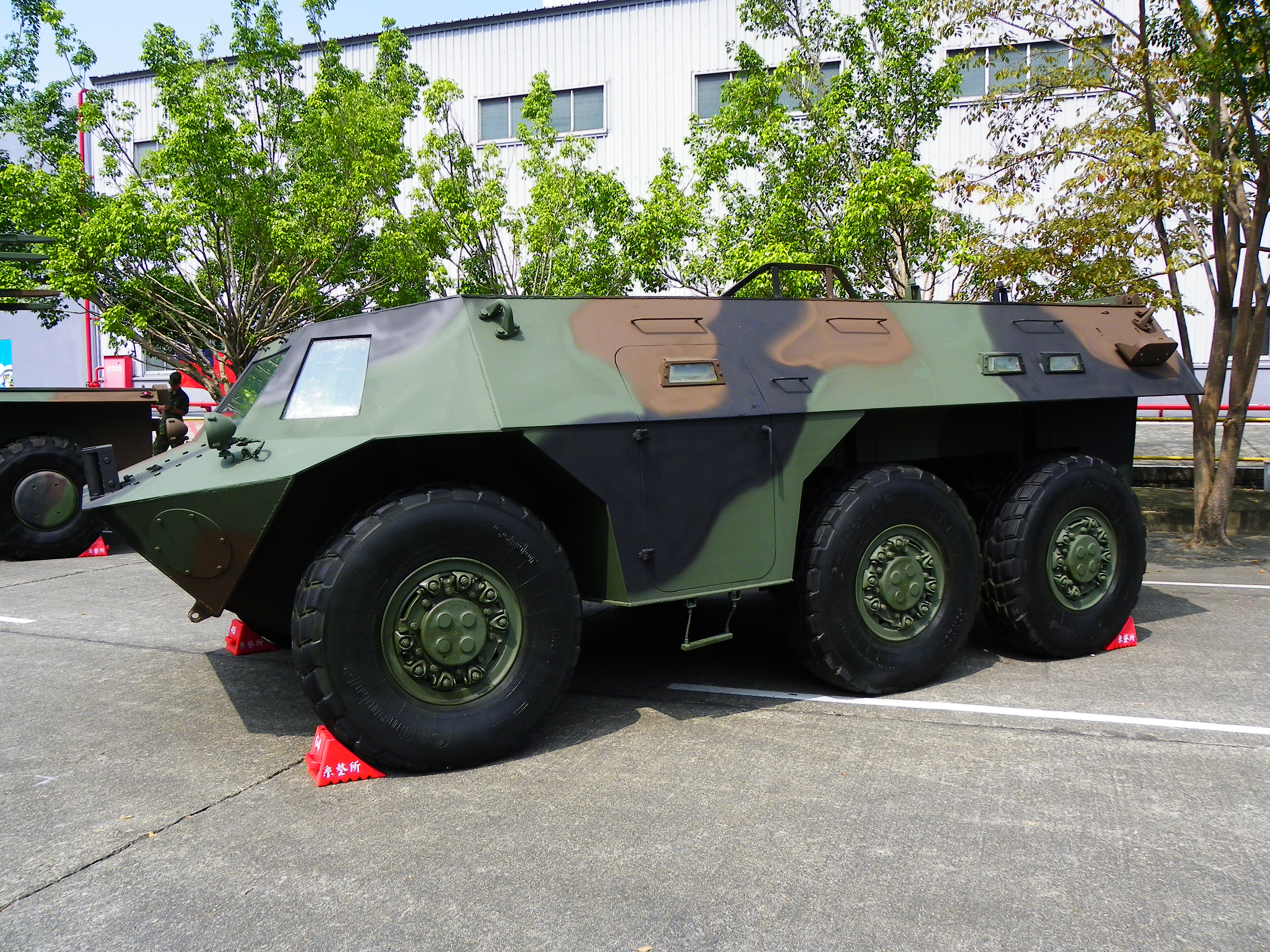
CM31 Prototype

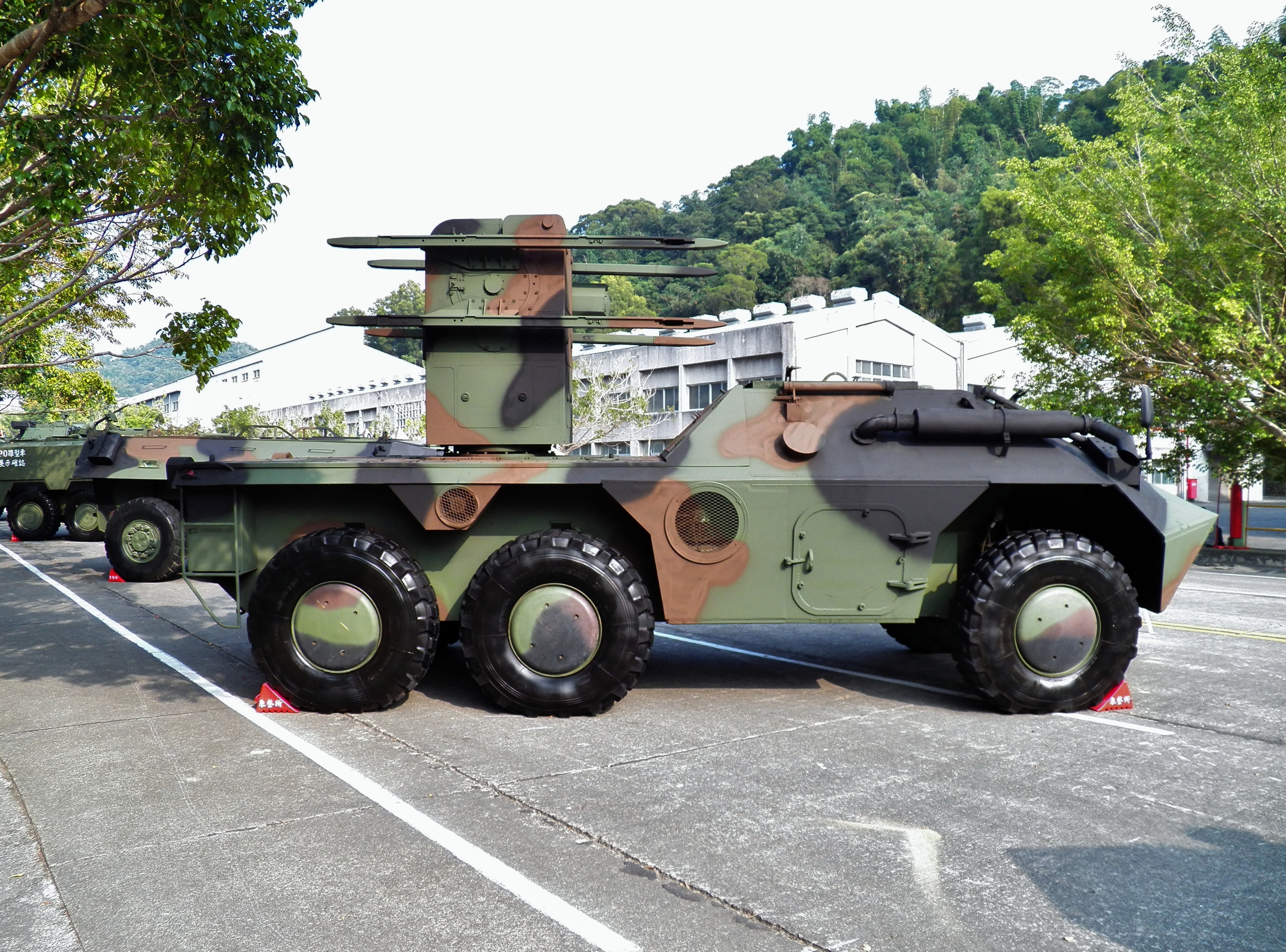
CM31 Anti-Aircraft Missiles Launcher Prototype

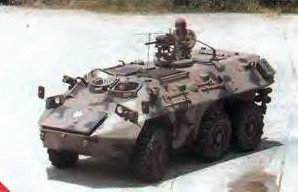
CM31

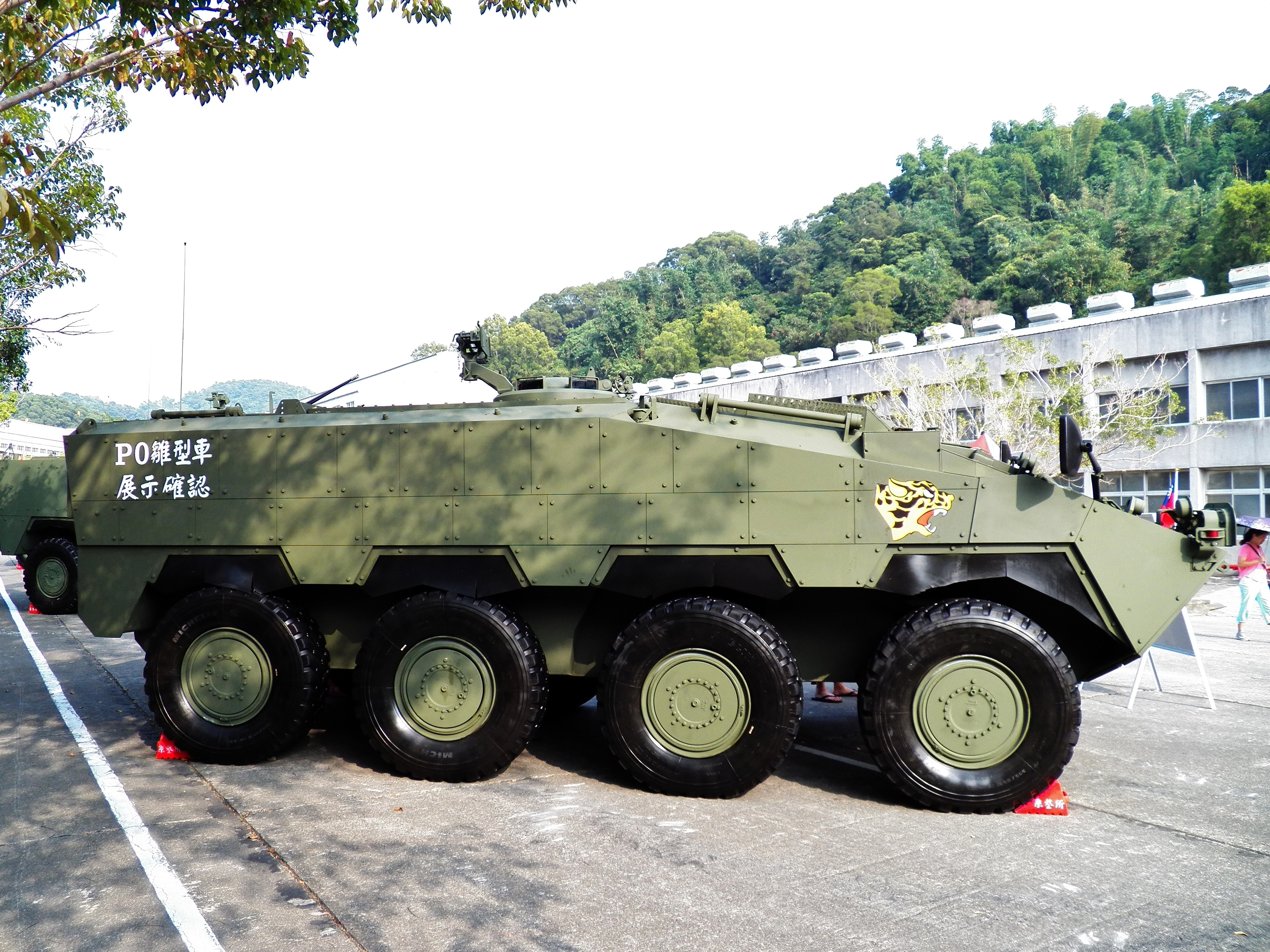
Cloud Leopard P0 prototype

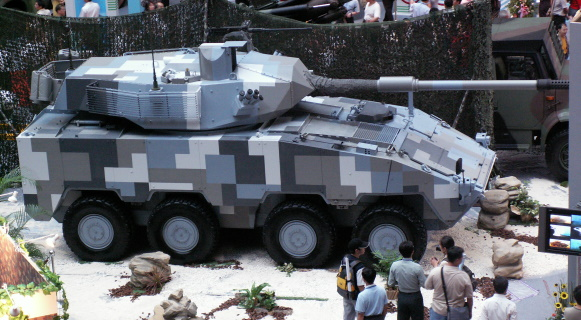
Cloud Leopard P1 prototype with 105mm tank gun

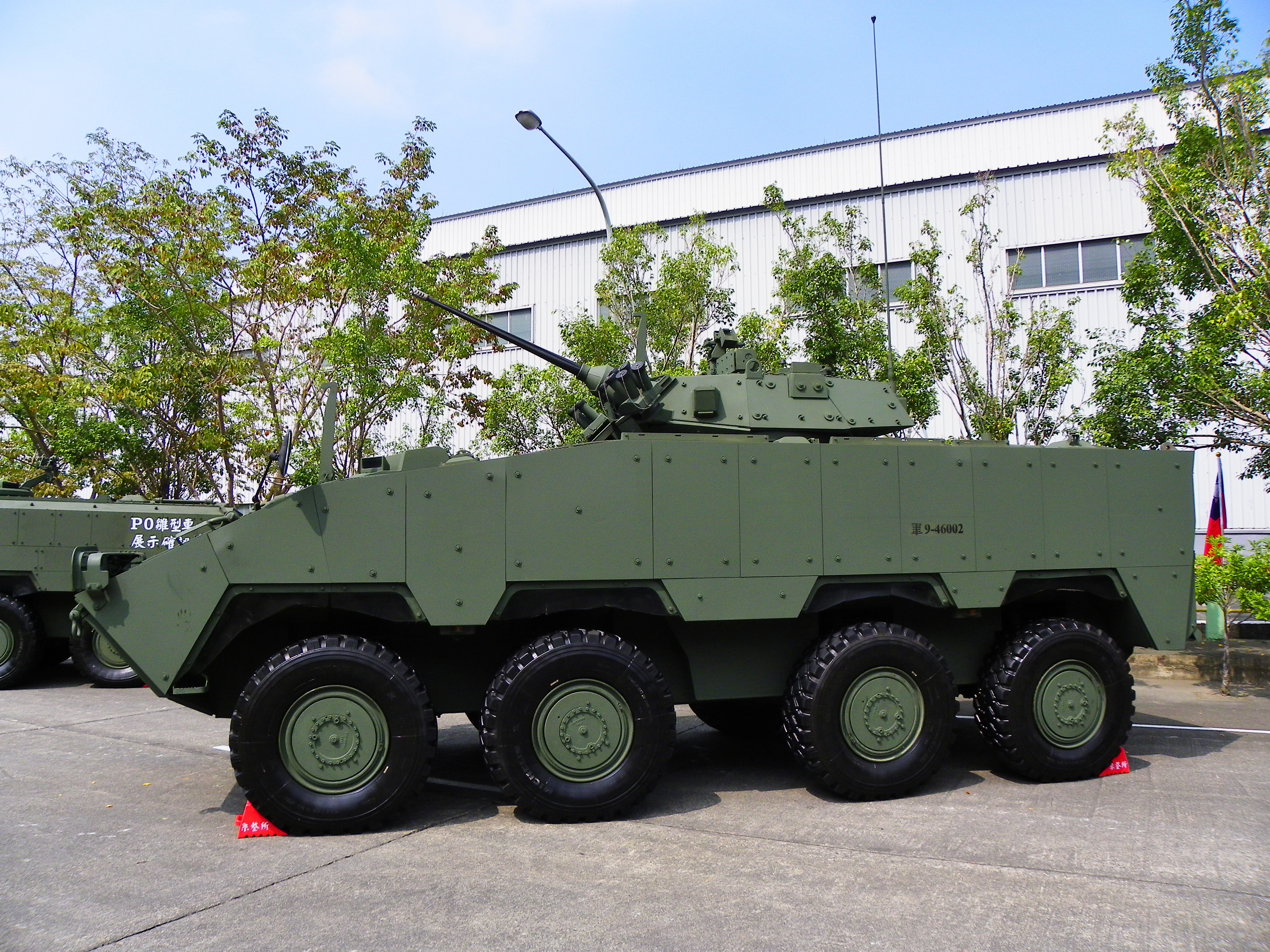
Cloud Leopard P2 prototype with M242 Bushmaster

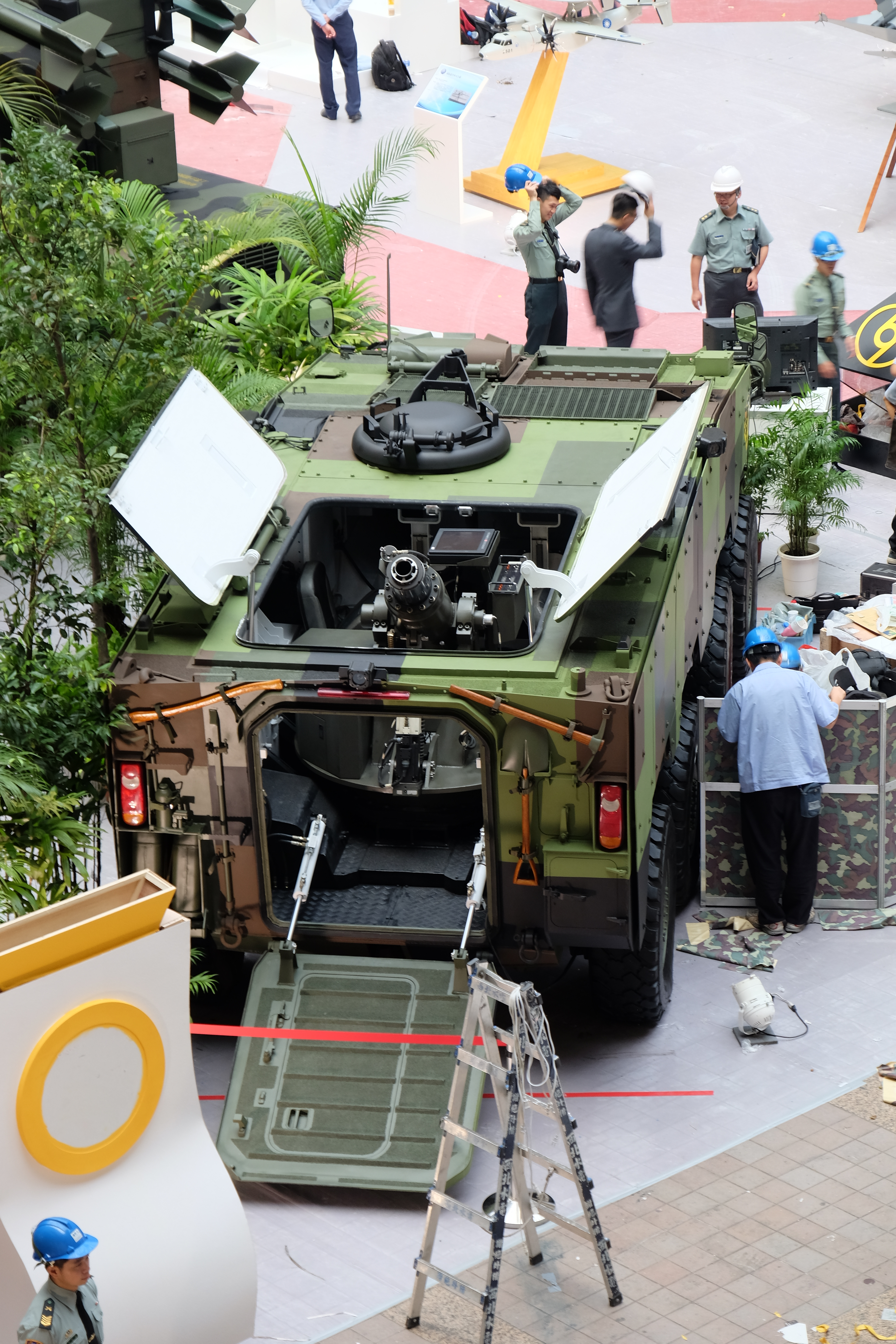
TADTE 2015, Cloud Leopard II M2 prototype with 81mm mortar Prototype

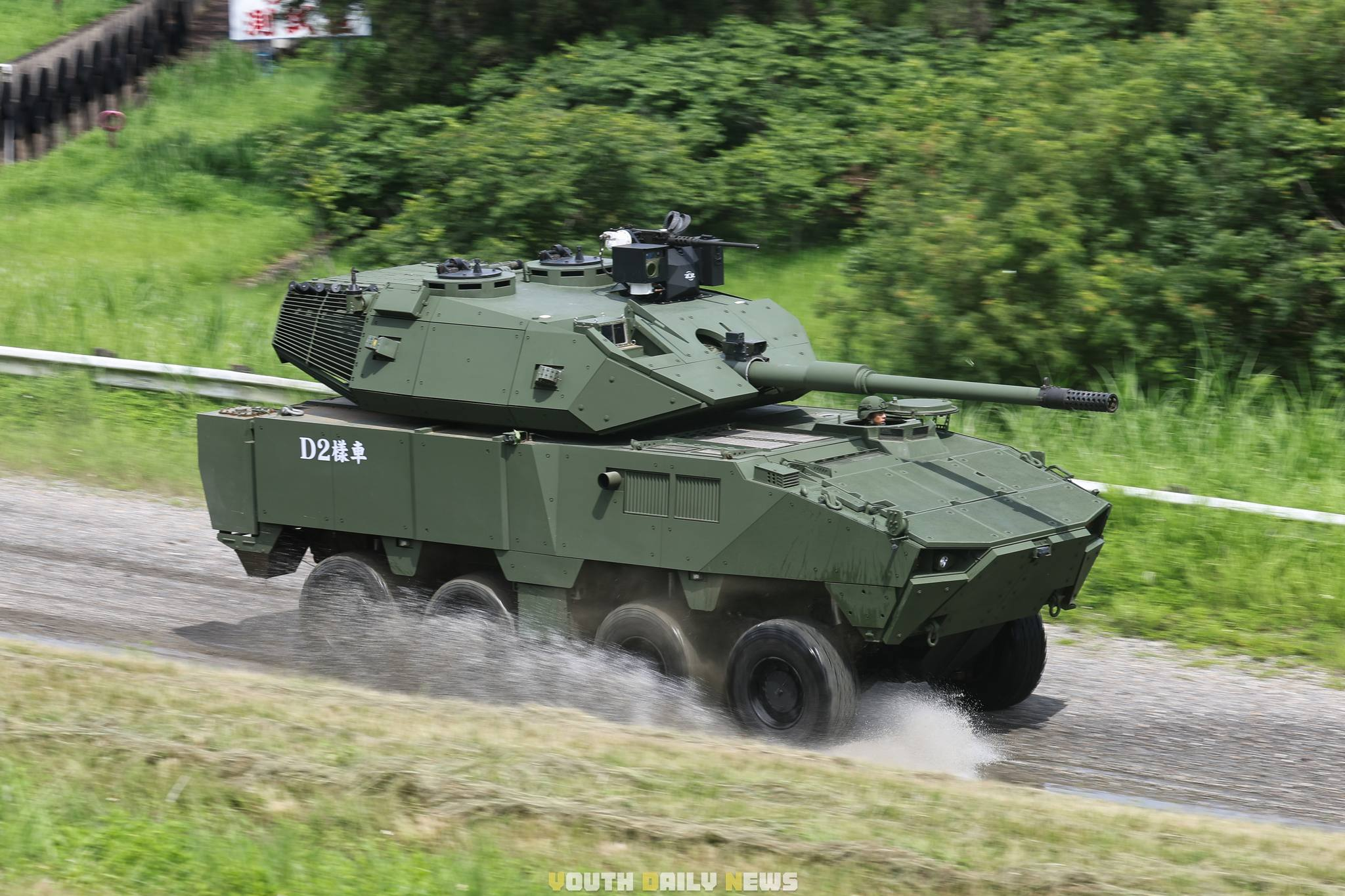
Cloud Leopard II D2 prototype with 105mm tank gun, 2024

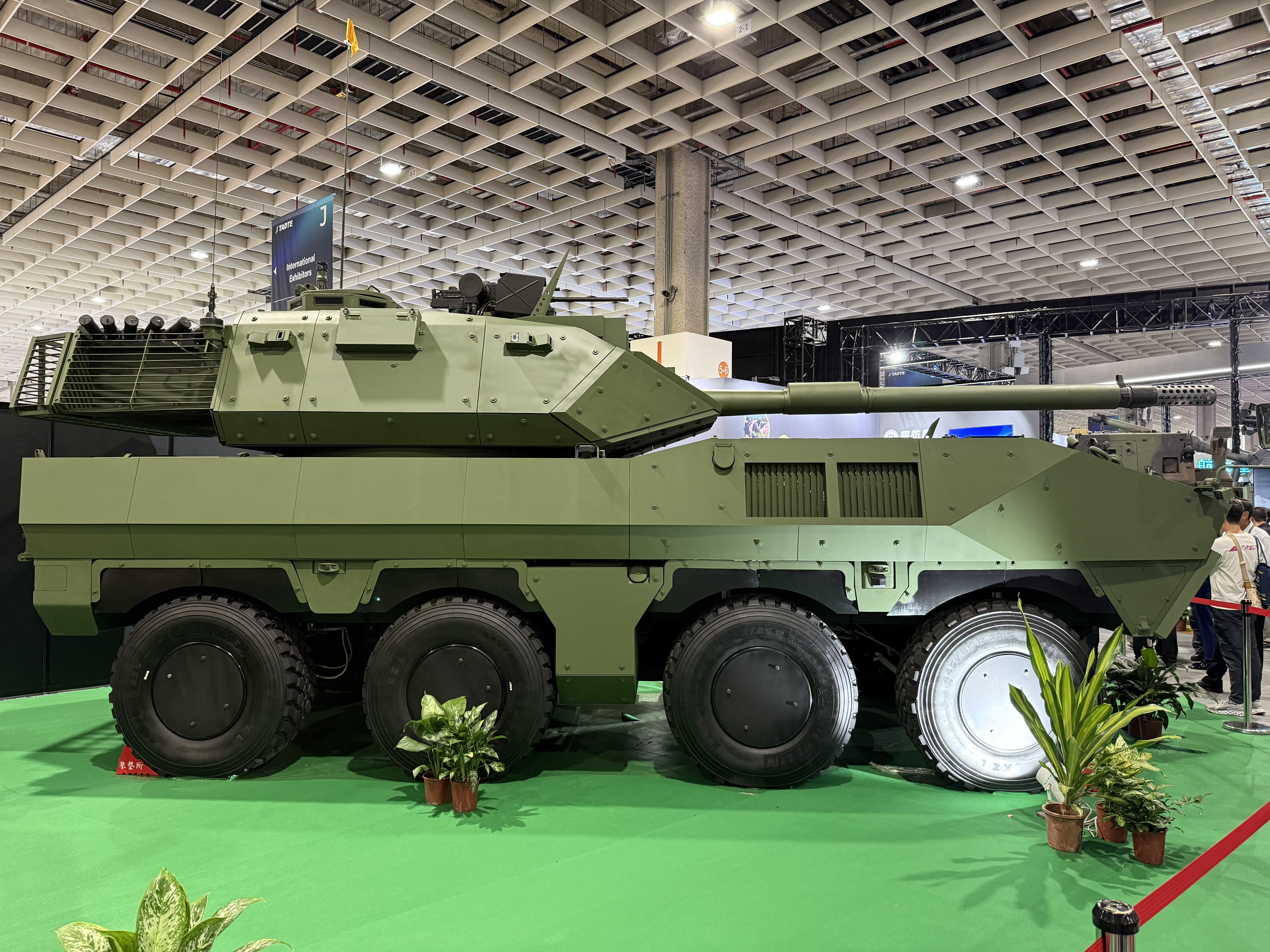
Cloud Leopard II D3 prototype with 105mm tank gun, 2025 Taipei Aerospace & Defense Technology Exhibition

=== Production and testing ===
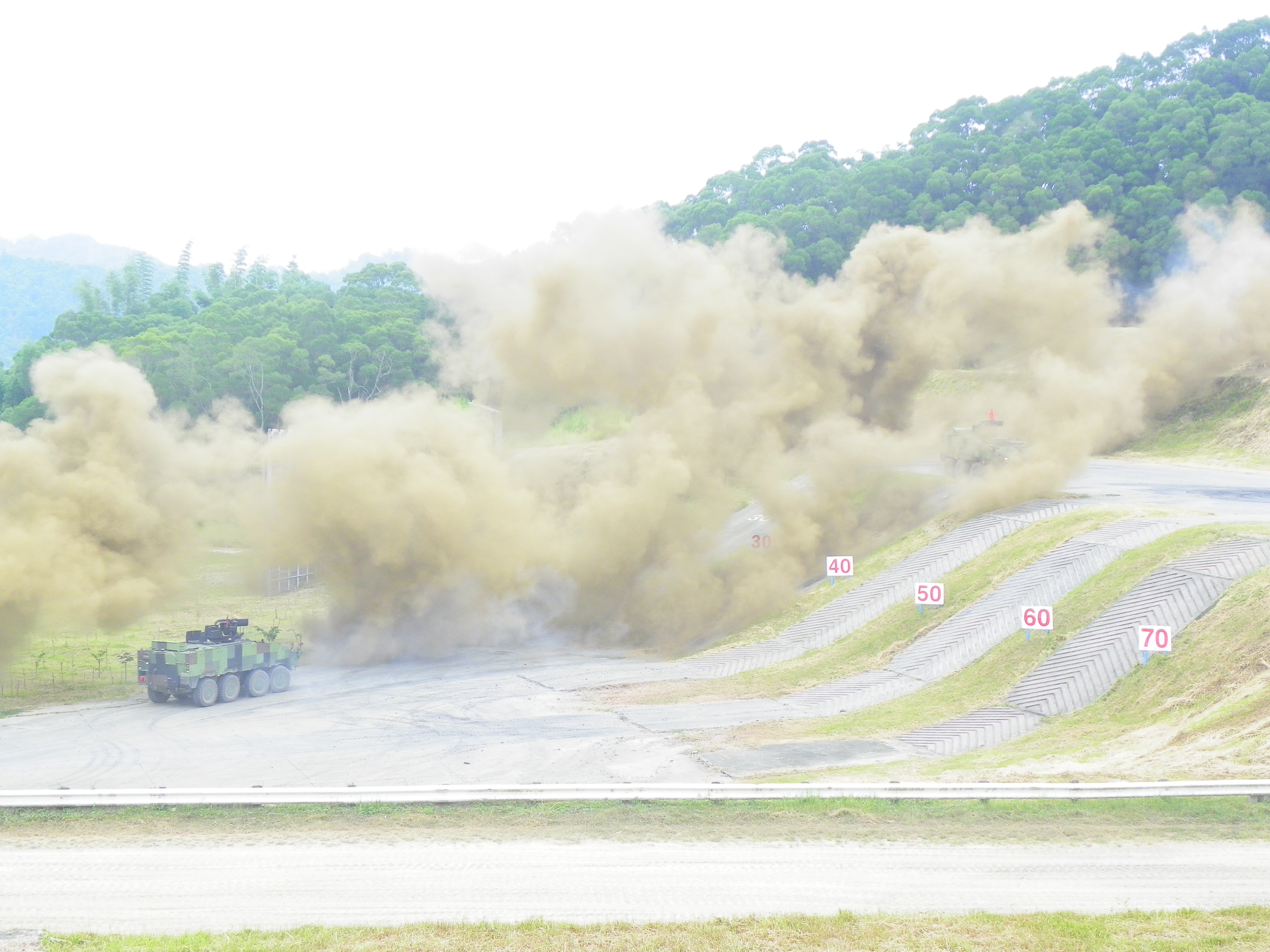
CM32 firing smoke grenades during testing

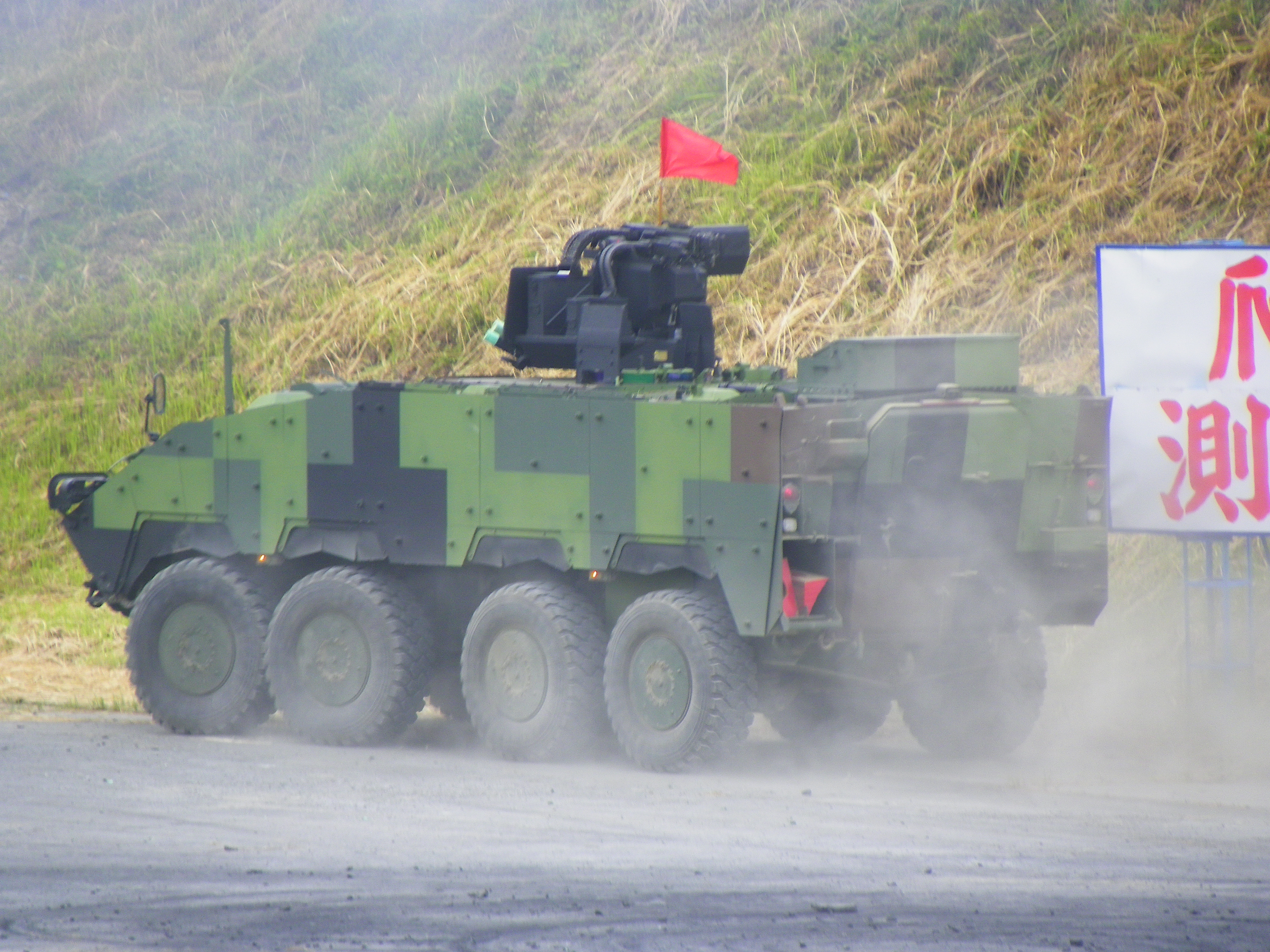
CM32 on the 40mm grenade range during testing

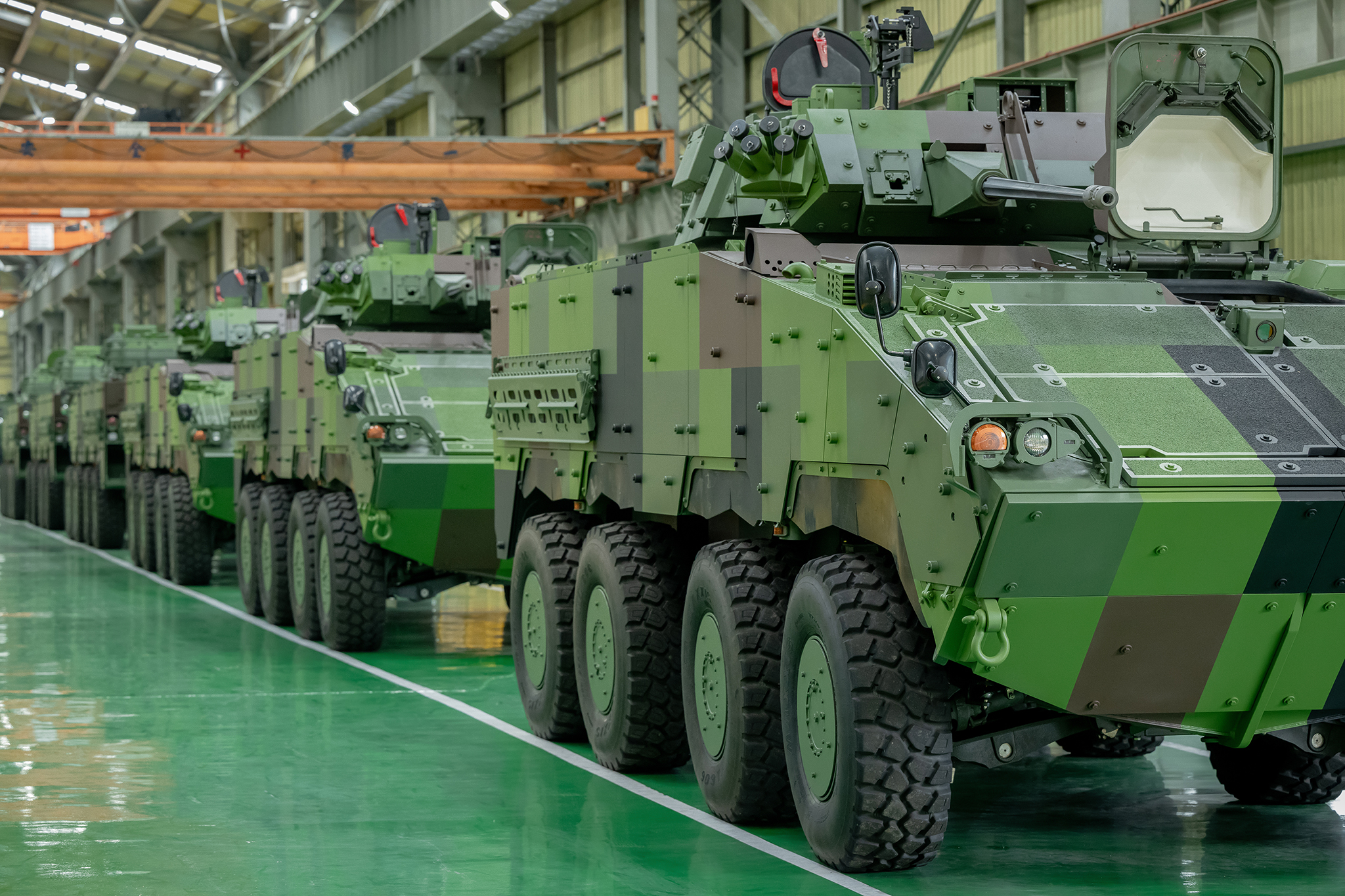
Completed CM34s at the factory

=== In operation ===
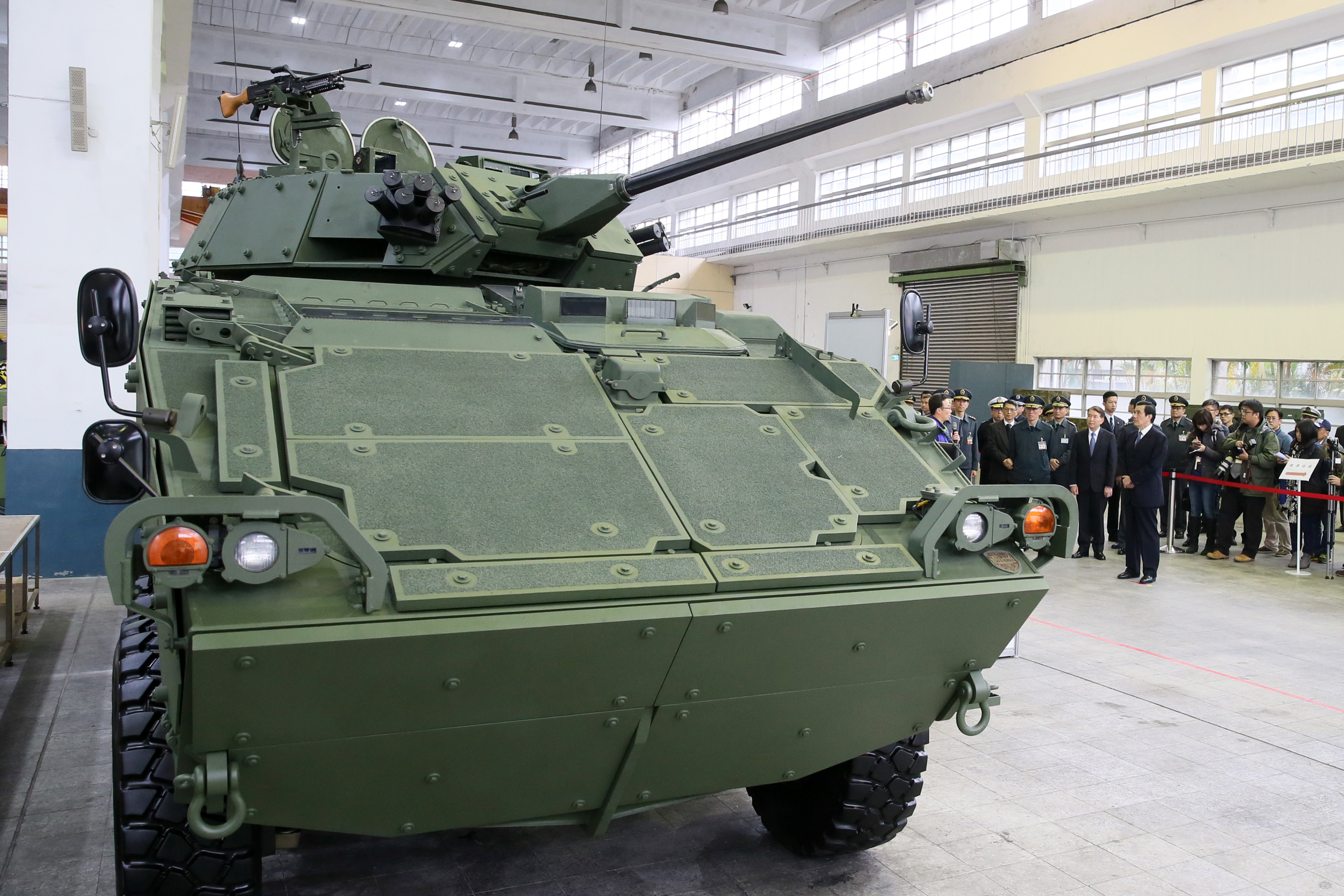
CM34 with 30 mm cannon and modular ceramic armor

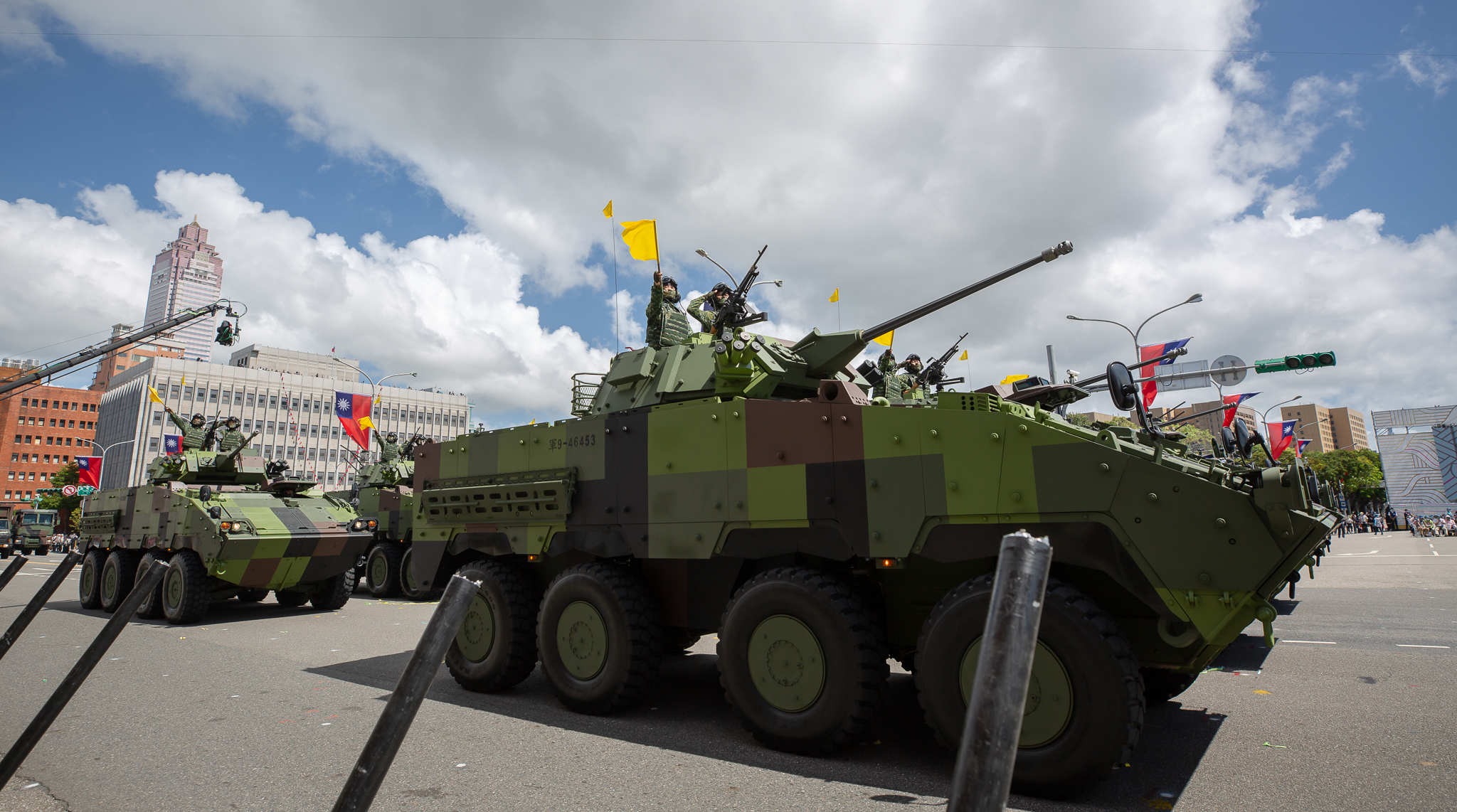
110th National Day, CM34 with 30 mm cannon exhibit

CM32 participating in an exerscise

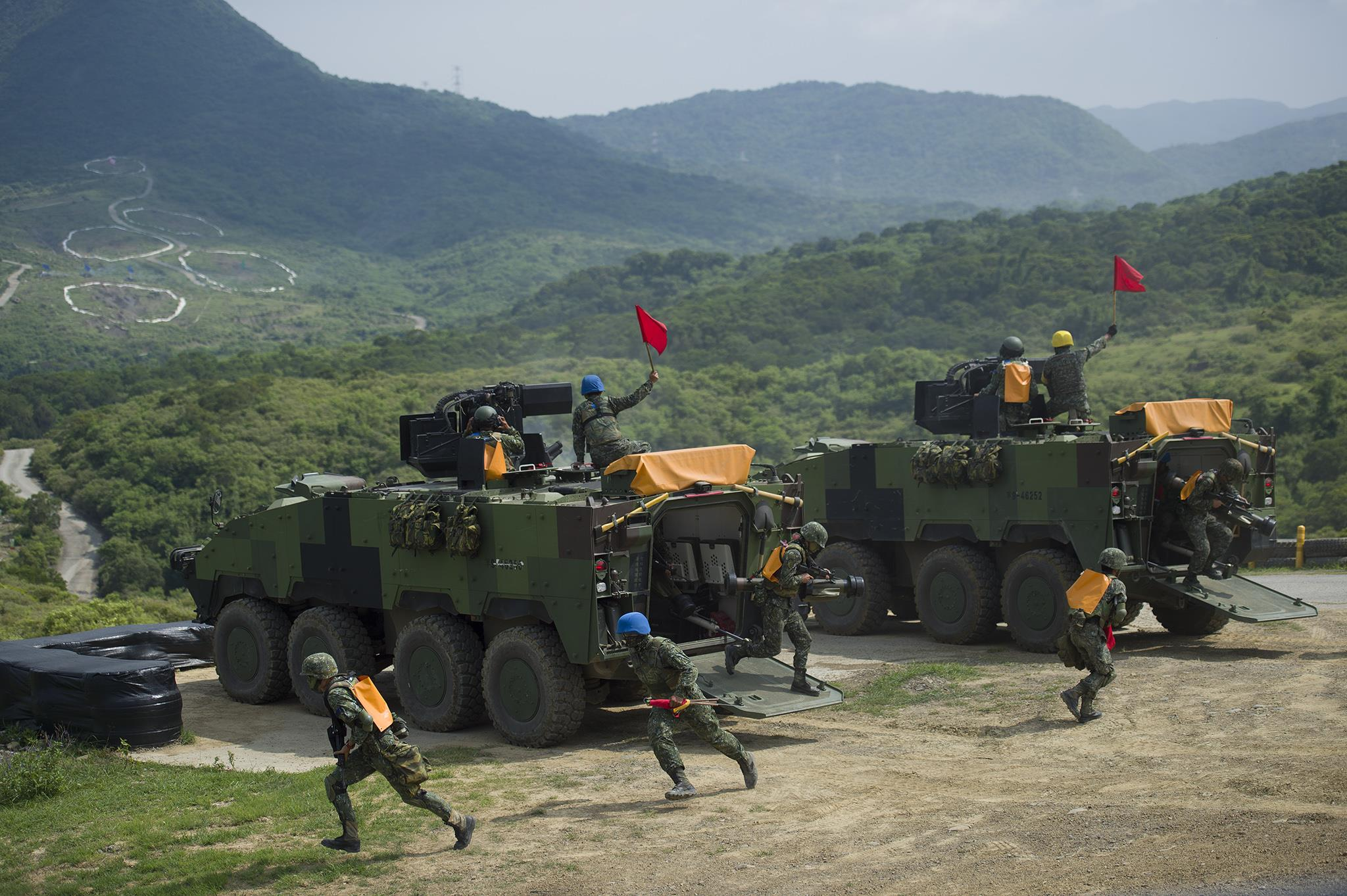
Military troops exiting Armored Personnel Carrier vehicles

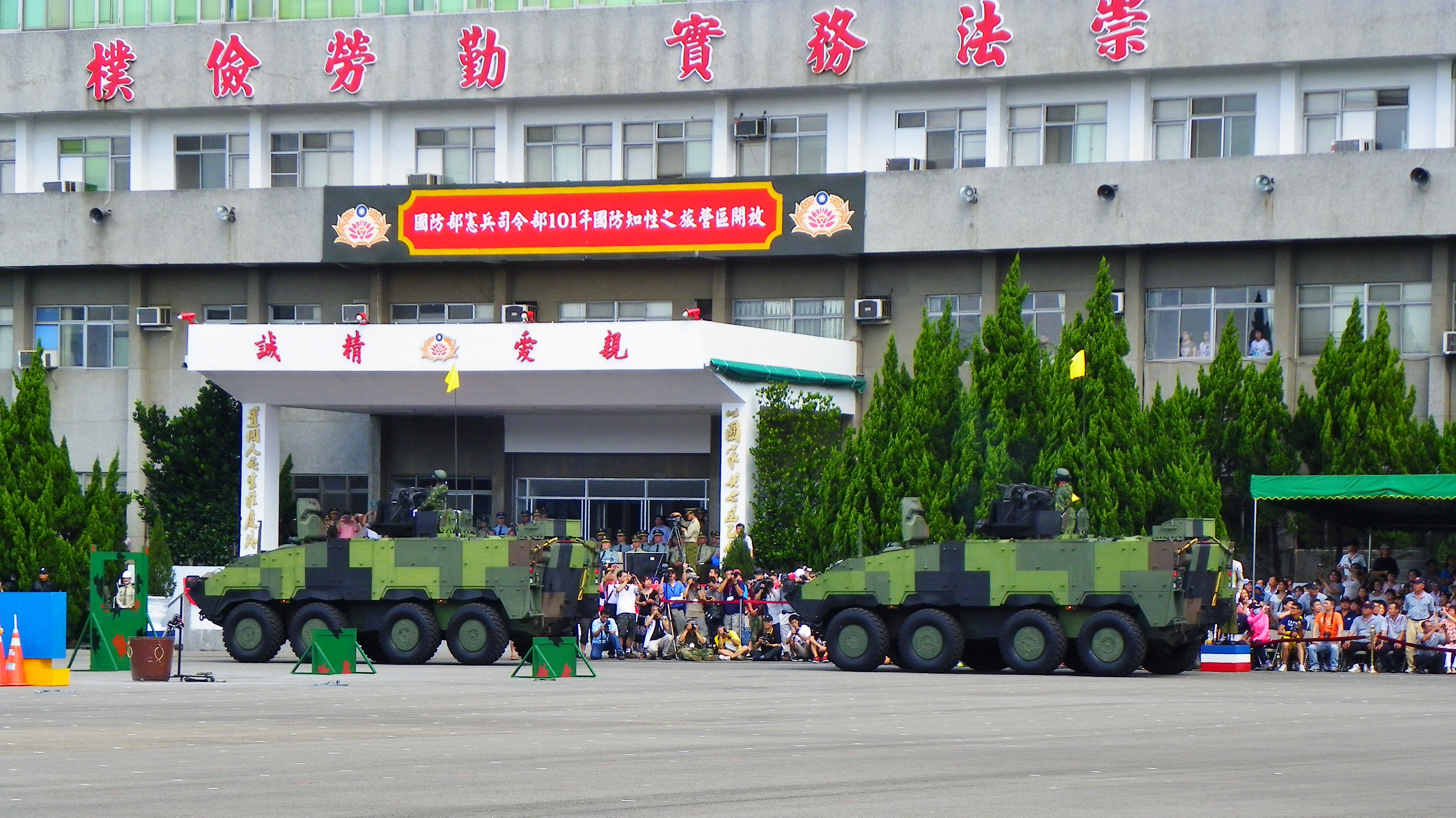
Yunpao APCs Parading through Reviewing Stand

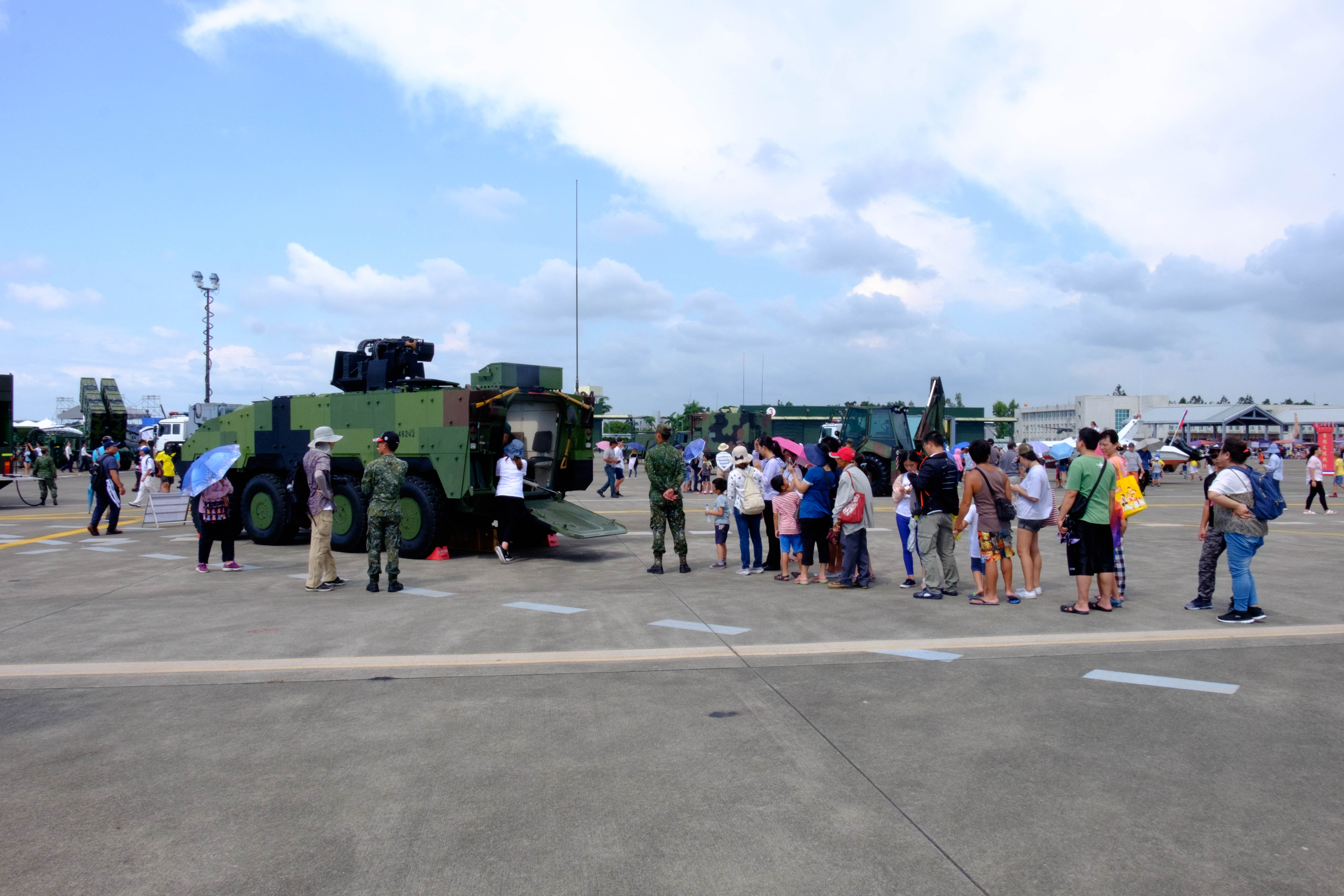
Queue of Visitors Waiting for aboard CM32 Yunpao APC at Gangshan Air Force Base

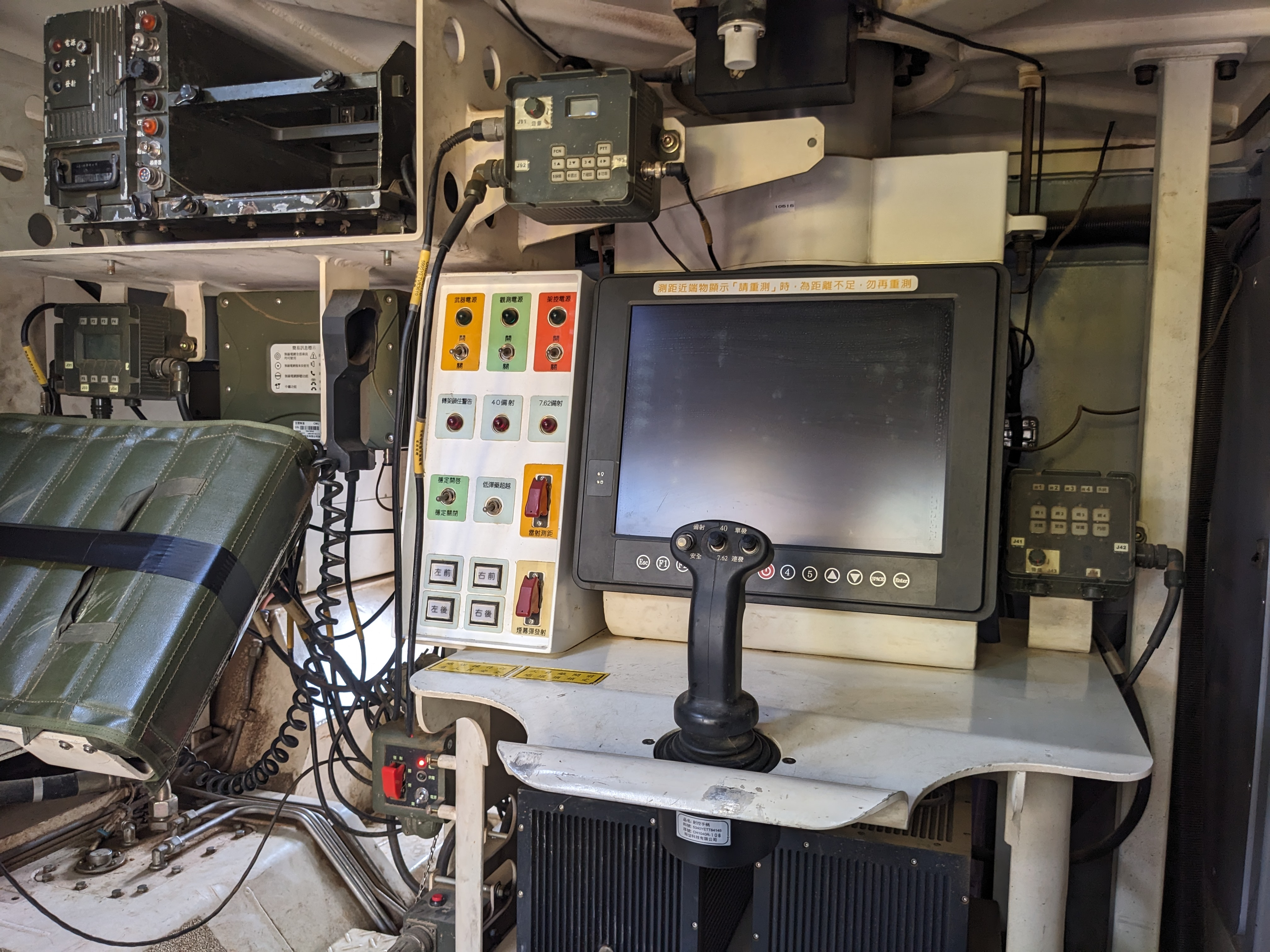
Turret control

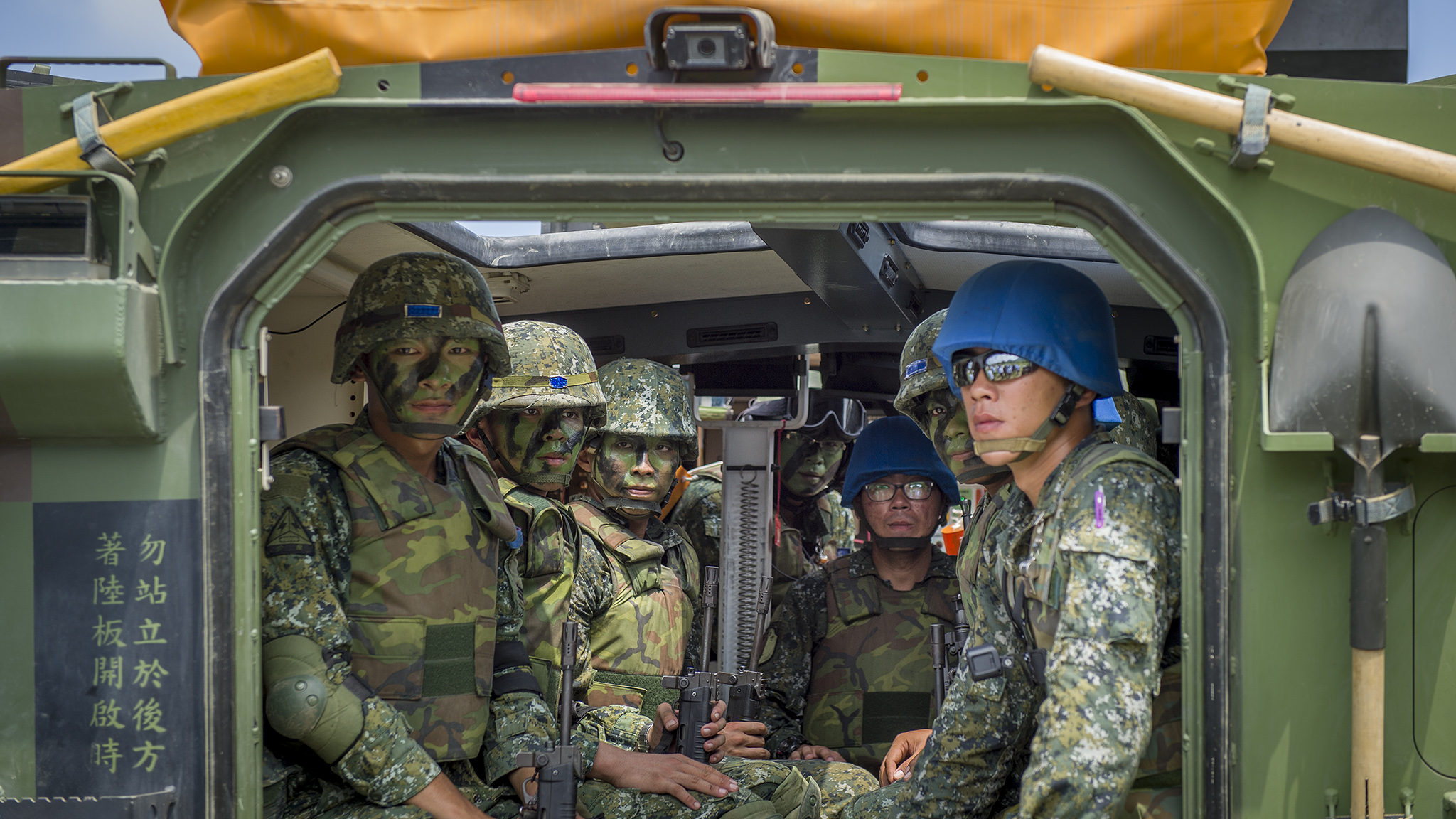
Soldiers in the back of a CM32

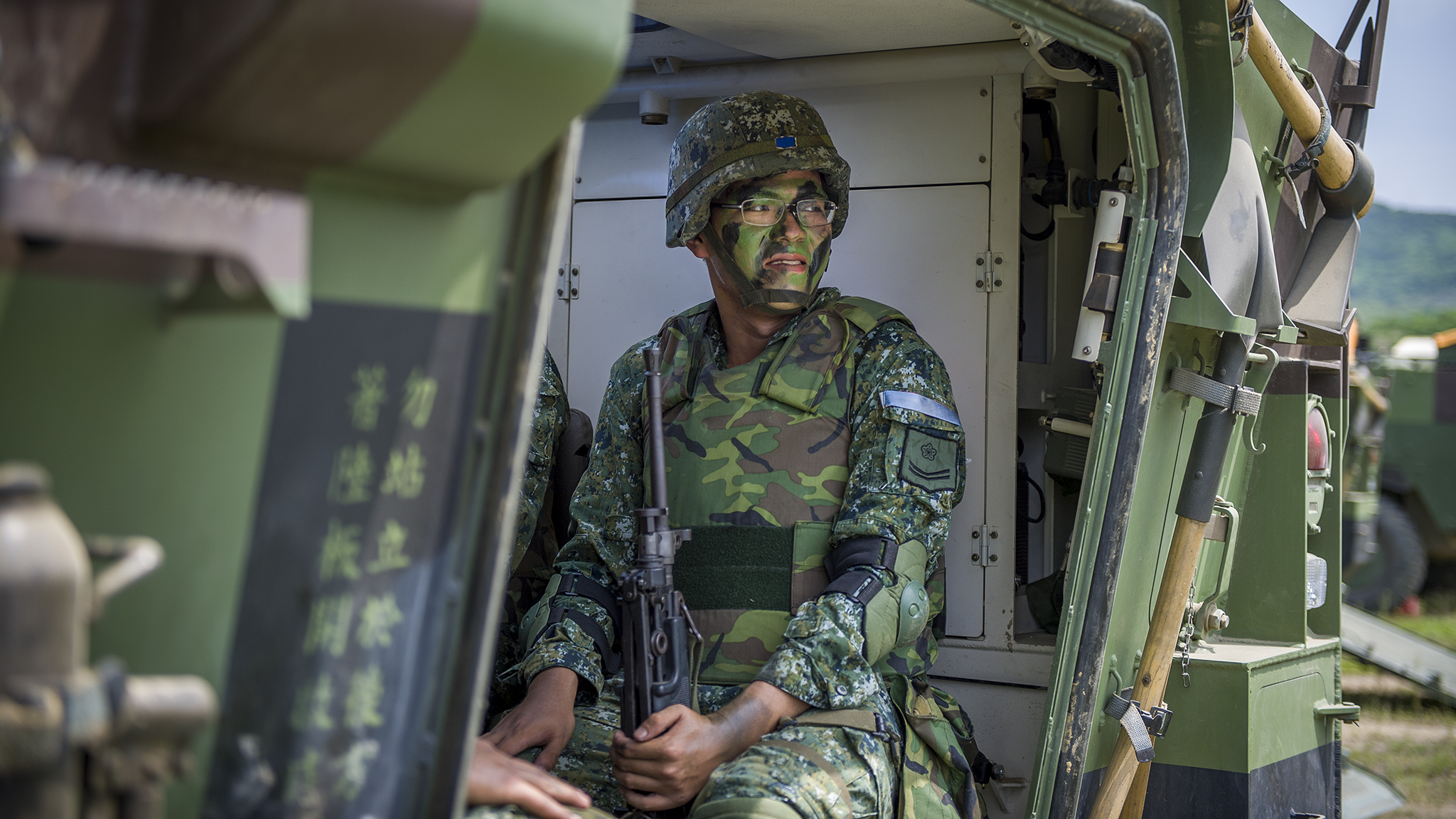
Machine gunner in the back of a CM32

== See also ==
=== Comparable vehicles ===
- Stryker – (United States, Canada)
- LAV family – (Canada)
  - LAV I – (Canada)
  - LAV II – (Canada)
    - LAV-25 – (Canada)
    - ASLAV – (Australia)
  - LAV III – (Canada)
- K808 White Tiger – (South Korea)
- Boxer – (Germany, Netherlands)
- Freccia IFV – (Italy)
- BTR-90 – (Russia)
- VPK-7829 Bumerang – (Russia)
- ZBL-08 – (China)
- Type 96 – (Japan)
- Type 16
- Patria AMV – (Finland)
- BTR-4 – (Ukraine)
- Saur 2 – (Romania)
- VBCI – (France)
- KTO Rosomak – (Poland)
- FNSS Pars – (Turkey)
- MOWAG Piranha – (Switzerland)

== Sources ==
- Jane's Information Group article: "CM-32 enters pre-production phase in Taiwan"
- John Pike. "CM32 8X8 Cloud Leopard Armoured Vehicle". GlobalSecurity.org
- "Comparative Levels of Ballistic Protection" on Armoured Fighting Vehicles - Globalsecurity
- MND denies armour on carrier vehicles is defective - Taipei Times. March 21, 2012
- 'Clouded Leopard' delivery delayed until 2019 - Taipei Times. December 27, 2012
- About 60 detained in military probe - Taipei Times. June 12, 2015
- Thirty-three indicted in military procurement case - Taipei Times. October 9, 2015
- The Modern Battle Tanks Of Asia - Monitoring the 21st Century Asian Arms Race
- The Eight By Eight APCs Transforming Modern War - Monitoring the 21st Century Asian Arms Race
- Taiwan's military-industrial complex dominates at arms show
