= Diffusion hardening =

Process used in manufacturing

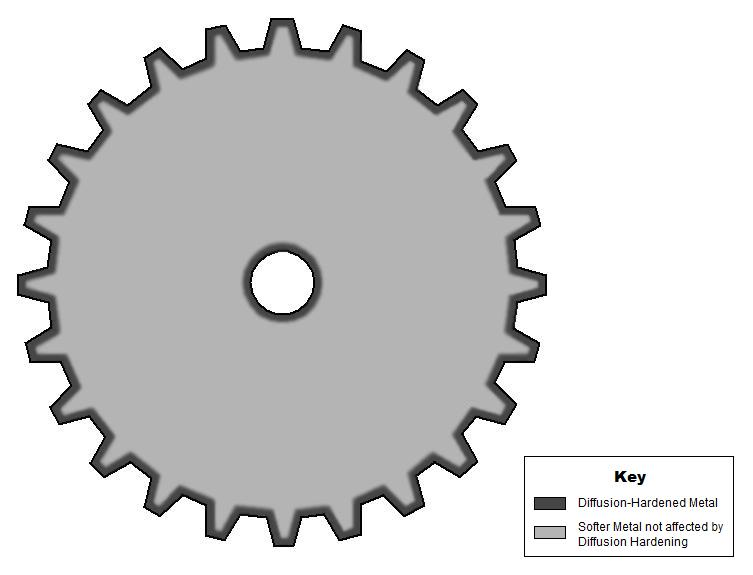
Schematic cutaway view of a diffusion hardened metal gear

Diffusion hardening is a process used in manufacturing that increases the hardness of steels. In diffusion hardening, diffusion occurs between a steel with a low carbon content and a carbon-rich environment to increase the carbon content of the steel and ultimately harden the workpiece. Diffusion only happens through a small thickness of a piece of steel (about 2.5 μm to 1.5 mm), so only the surface is hardened while the core maintains its original mechanical properties. Heat treating may be performed on a diffusion hardened part to increase the hardness of the core as desired, but in most cases in which diffusion hardening is performed, it is desirable to have parts with a hard outer shell and a more ductile inside. Heat treating and quenching is a more efficient process if hardness is desired throughout the whole part. In the case of manufacturing parts subject to large amounts of wear, such as gears, the non-uniform properties acquired through diffusion hardening are desired. Through this process, gears obtain a hard wear-resistant outer shell but maintain their softer and more impact-resistant core.

== Process ==
Diffusion hardening is performed by completely surrounding a metal part with the element to be diffused into it in either the solid, liquid, or gas phase depending on the type of diffusion process being performed. The concentration of the diffusing element surrounding the part must be higher than the concentration of the element inside the part, or diffusion will not occur. The metal and the surrounding element must then be heated to a temperature sufficiently high for diffusion to occur. In the case of pack carburizing, the temperature must be 900 °C and the part must be allowed to sit for 12 to 72 hours for the correct amount of diffusion to occur.

== Types ==
Diffusion hardening can be done in many different ways to achieve different hardnesses and different surface finishes on metal parts. Some of the different diffusion hardening operations include: Carburizing, Nitriding, Carbonitriding, Nitrocarburizing, Boriding, Titanium-carbon diffusion, and Toyota diffusion. While diffusion hardening is performed mainly on steel parts and carbon is mainly the element used for diffusion, diffusion hardening can also be performed with other diffusion elements and with other metals. In nitriding, nitrogen is diffused into the surface of steel, but can also be used with metals such as aluminum, chromium, molybdenum, and vanadium. Besides metals and diffusion elements used, diffusion hardening processes differ in the temperature required for diffusion, the phase of the diffusion element, and additional treatments such as quenching and tempering. These different factors greatly affect surface finish and dimensional accuracy of a part. A quenched and tempered part does not have the same dimensional accuracy as a part that has not undergone such a process. Also, they can affect the efficiency of the overall process. In carburizing, the carbon can be in any of the solid, liquid, or gas phases. Although using carbon in the solid phase is usually the safest and easiest of these to work with, the process is difficult to control and the heating is inefficient. All these things must come into consideration when choosing a diffusion hardening process.

== See also ==
- case-hardening

== Sources ==
- Diffusion Treatment Hardening. eFunda. Retrieved 19 April 2008.
- Surface Hardening of Steels. Key to Metals. Retrieved 19 April 2008.
