= Ipsen International Holding =

German industrial furnace manufacturer

Ipsen International Holding GmbH
- Company type: GmbH
- Industry: Industrial furnaces
- Founded: 1957; 69 years ago
- Founder: Harold Ipsen
- Headquarters: Kleve, Germany
- Area served: Worldwide
- Key people: Geoffrey Somary (Group CEO) and Houman Khorram (CFO)
- Products: Atmosphere Furnaces, Pusher-Type Furnaces, Batch Furnaces, Heat-Treating Software
- Number of employees: 1,000
- Website: ipsenglobal.com

Ipsen International Holding is a German manufacturing company based in Kleve that develops, constructs and manufactures industrial furnaces. Its managing directors are Geoffrey Somary and Houman Khorram.

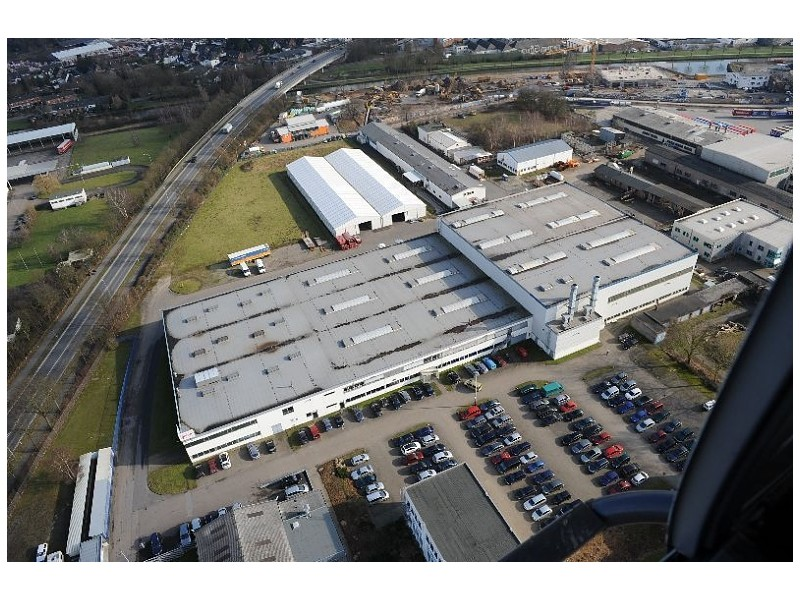
Factory in Kleve

As of 2022, the Ipsen Group had 1,000 employees worldwide and had manufacturing sites in Germany, United States, and India, with support centers in China und Japan. It also had sales/service representation in 34 other countries.

== History ==
The company was founded as Ipsen Industries by Harold Ipsen (1915-1965) in Rockford, Illinois in 1948. The company expanded to its German manufacturing site in Kleve in 1957.

== Products ==
Ipsen's industrial furnaces are used for hardening steel and other metals in different processes to satisfy completely the high-quality requirements of engines, gears, generating plant manufacturing and other industrial parts and equipment.

Ipsen has customers in medical technology and engineering, wind power generation, aviation, food, automotive, aerospace, tool manufacturing, mechanical engineering and hardening shops.

Heat treatment is a crucial, very cost-effective process to considerably improve the structural conditions and consequently the resilience of metals, in particular to steel and titanium alloys. Ipsen's industrial furnaces - vacuum furnaces, atmosphere furnaces and pusher-type furnaces - are used for the following heat treatment processes: hardening, quenching, tempering, carburization, carbon nitriding, nitro carburization, bright tempering, annealing, vacuum brazing, temperature brazing, plasma nitriding
