= Liquid nitriding =

Liquid nitriding may refer to:

- Salt bath nitriding
- Salt bath ferritic nitrocarburizing
