= Grand Power K100 =

K100
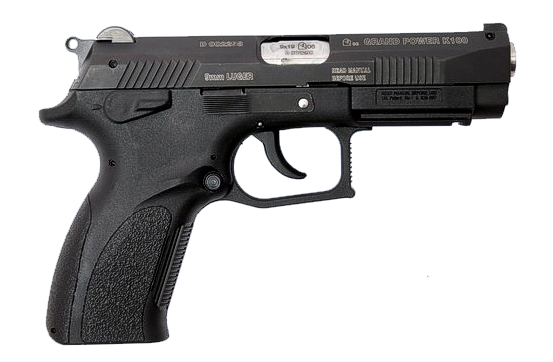
- Grand Power K100 Mark 6
- Type: Semi-automatic pistol
- Place of origin: Slovakia

Production history
- Designer: Jaroslav Kuracina
- Designed: 1994–1996
- Manufacturer: Grand Power s.r.o.
- Produced: 2002–present
- Variants: K100 Tactical, K100 Mark 6, K100 Mark 7, K100 Mark 12, K100 DAO, K100 QA, K100 Target, X-CALIBUR, GPC9, K100 Whisper, K102 R, K105 R, P1

Specifications
- Mass: 680 g (24 oz)-985 g (34.7 oz)
- Length: 179 mm (7.0 in)-228 mm (9.0 in)
- Barrel length: 85 mm (3.3 in)-127 mm (5.0 in)
- Width: 36 mm (1.4 in)
- Height: 133.5 mm (5.3 in)-140 mm (5.5 in)
- Cartridge: 4 mm Flobert Short; 6 mm Flobert; 6 mm ME Flobert.22 long rifle.380 ACP; 9×19mm Parabellum; 9×18mm Makarov.357 SIG.40 S&W; 10mm Auto.45 ACP
- Action: Short recoil operated, rotating barrel
- Feed system: 10,12,14 or 15-round detachable box magazine
- Sights: Fixed, front blade and adjustable rear notch 160 mm (6.3 in) sight radius

The K100 is a 9×19mm semi-automatic pistol designed and built by Grand Power s.r.o. in Slovenská Ľupča, Slovakia located approximately 11 kilometers east of Banská Bystrica, Slovakia which is the region's major city.

== Development ==
The K100 was developed by Jaroslav Kuracina, a former weapons officer in the Slovak Army. Kuracina sketched drawings of the K100 as early as 1992, but manufacturing activities were highly restricted during the early post-Communist era. Kuracina would be forced to wait until 1996 to continue development of his design. In 2007 Grand Power announced a deal to produce 100,000 units for the U.S. market in partnership with Texas-based handgun manufacturer STI International Inc. The first pistols were exported in 2008. They were K100 Mk6 pistols under the commercial name GP 6.

== Design details ==
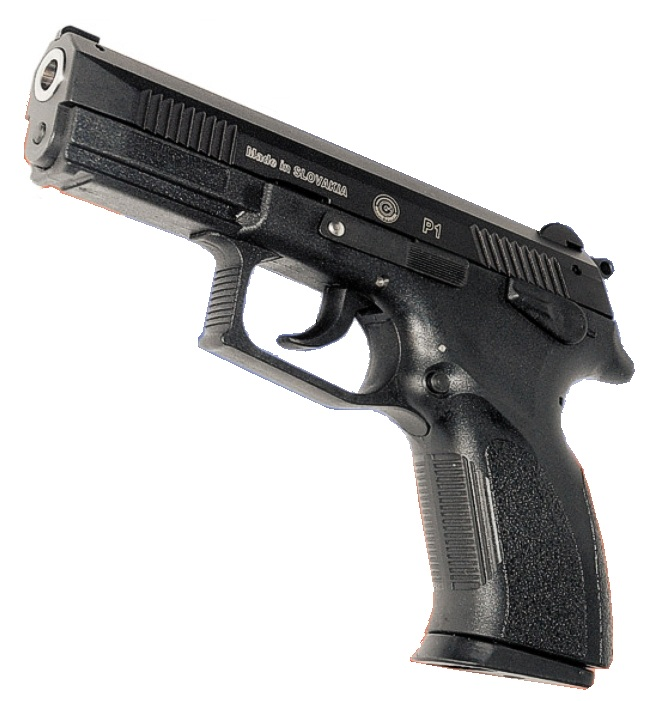
The P1 variant.

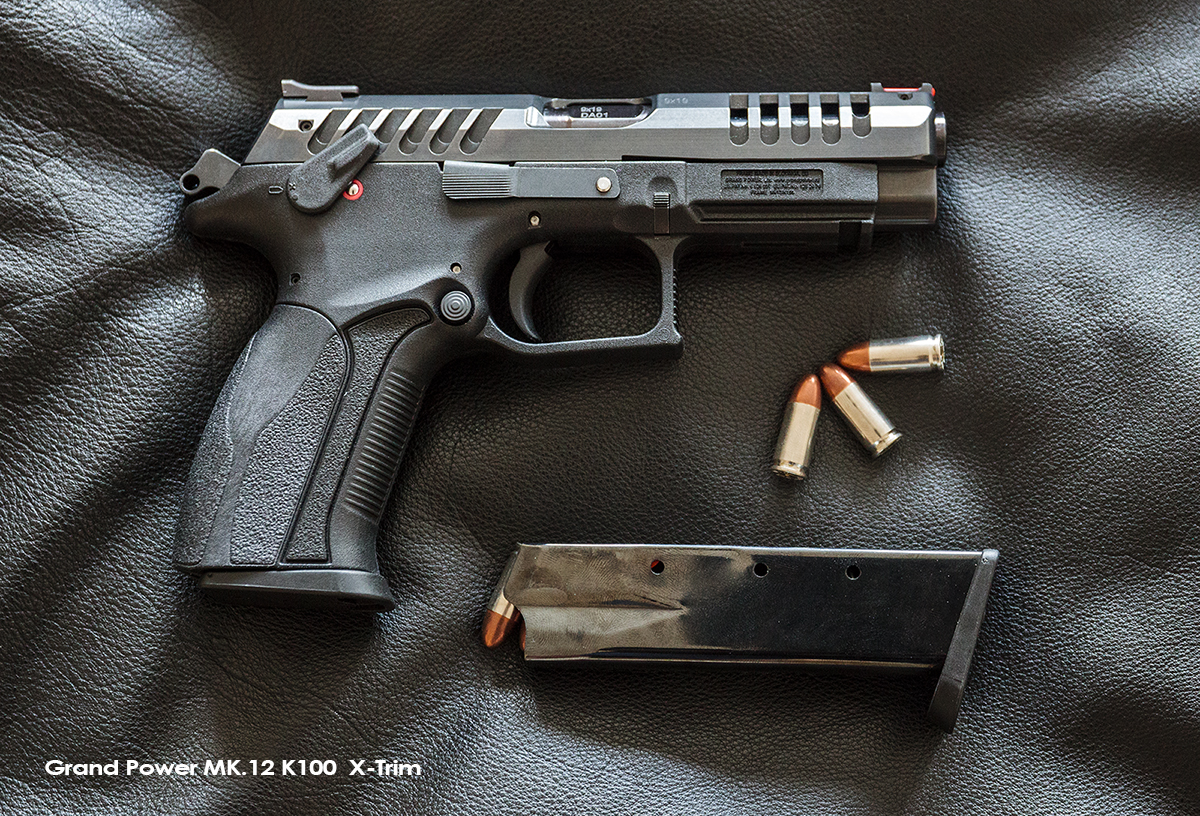
Grand Power MK.12 K100 X-Trim in 9mm

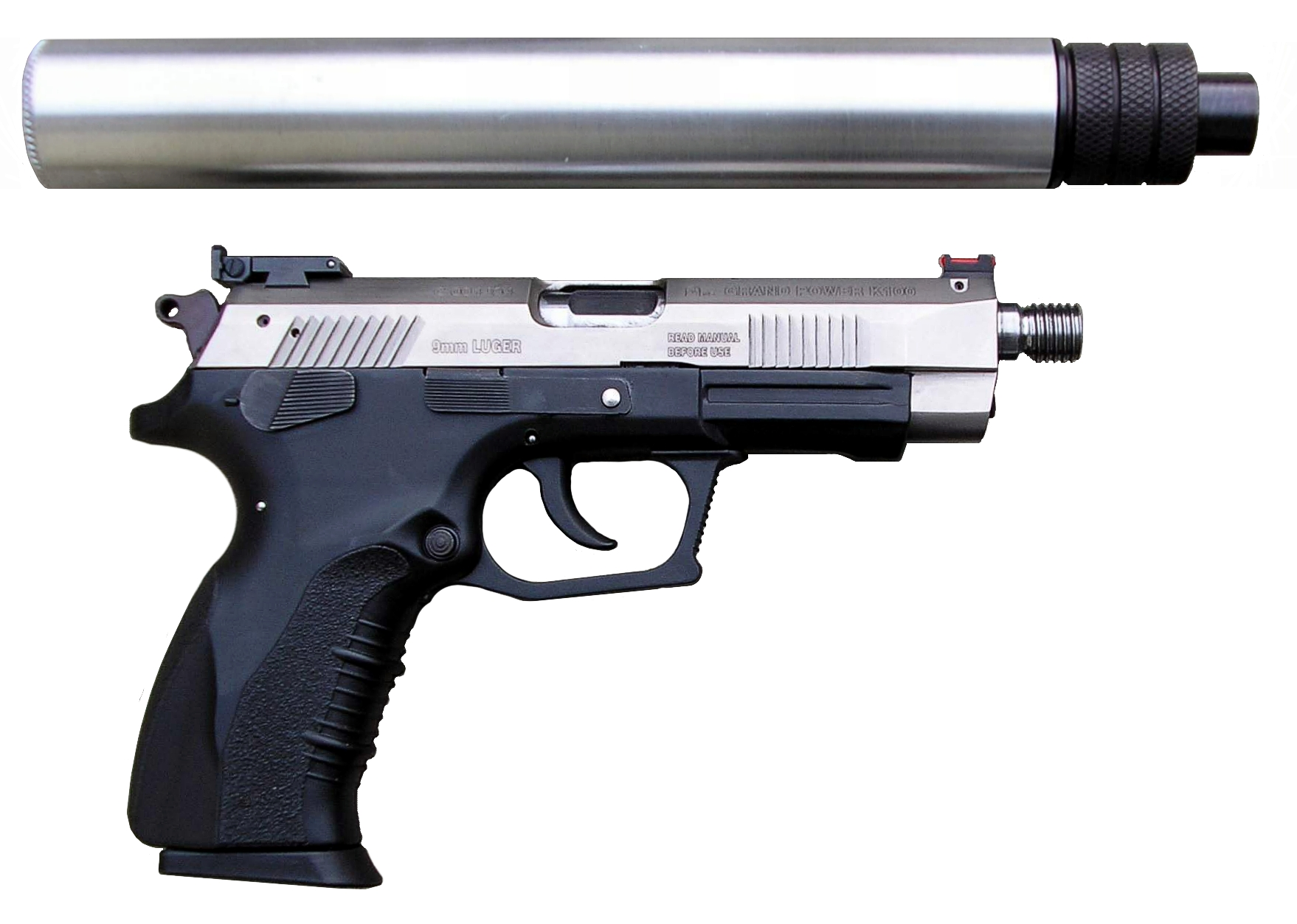
The K100 Whisper with threaded barrel and suppressor.

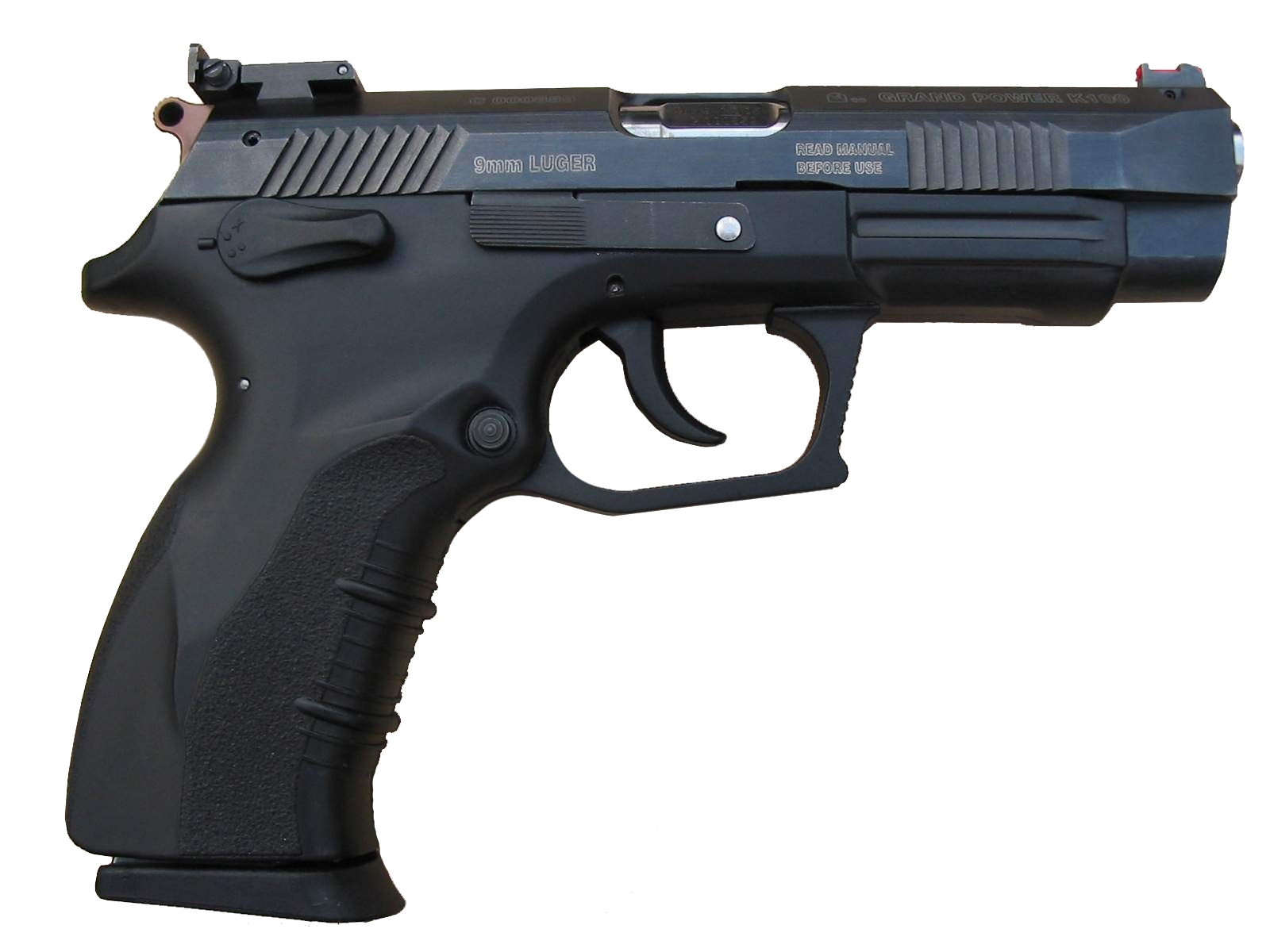
Competition-oriented K100 Target.

The K100 uses a rare rotating barrel locking system, similar in some ways to the Beretta Cougar, Beretta Px4 Storm, and Brügger & Thomet MP9, which in the K100's case is cammed by a cross pin. When the pistol is fired, the barrel and slide move backward together for about 3/8 of an inch while the barrel is cammed clockwise (with respect to the shooter) by a flat, twisting, helical "cut" in the barrel extension. Once the barrel and slide have moved back to the point where the barrel has twisted about 45°, the slide is free to continue traveling back while the barrel's travel is arrested by its interface to the frame via the barrel extension's square shoulders. On the K100, the Beretta's barrel extension cam cut, and transfer block's cam tooth, are replaced by a curled, twisting cut in the barrel extension, and a round, frame-embedded cross-pin respectively. As such, there is no transfer block (locking block) per se, and the barrel extension directly interfaces with the frame via the replaceable cross-pin. The design allows a low bore axis relative to the shooter's hand and avoids the use of the transfer/locking block typically found in rotating barrel pistols.

Both of the Berettas, and the K100, have the archetypal square shouldered lock protruding from the otherwise round barrel, easily visible at the ejection port with the slide fully forward. This square shoulder is rotated in behind a solid column of steel running the length of the slide forward of the ejection port, and on the left side out of view, when the slide and barrel are fully forward in battery. This locks the slide forward in battery. Given that the MP9 uses the same basic locking mechanism, and has a cyclical rate of fire of 900 rounds/min, the rotating barrel lock has shown itself to be capable of very fast lock times.

The thick walled barrel and other metal parts are treated by Tenifer QPQ technology. This hardens the metal components and increases resistance to corrosion.

The standard K100 has a barrel length of 108 mm (4.3 in) and operates in both single- and double-action modes. The hammer must be manually decocked for carry in double-action mode with a chambered round. The safety can be applied with the hammer cocked, but can not be applied with the hammer in the forward position. The safety does not lock the slide. A decocking hammer group is available as an option on many models.

The ergonomically shaped polymer grip frame houses a steel receiver which provides the rails the slide travels on as well as hardpoints required for the trigger mechanism. The slide spring guide, safety, trigger, and trigger guard are polymer.

The pistol's toothy surface, and grooved grips, provide good grip even with wet hands. The K100 also features ambidextrous controls, supporting both left and right-handed users. Current production Grand Power pistols use a solid trigger guard and a new take down lever. They also have 4 user interchangeable grip backstraps to accommodate various hand shapes and sizes; this feature permits most shooters a comfortable and efficient grip on the firearm.

== Variants ==
According to manufacturer, these are the variants of the K100.

=== G9F ===
Rimfire version based on the P380, which holds 15 cartridges that must be reloaded manually, as the low power of Flobert ammunition is insufficient to trigger blowback-operated reloading.

Like the K100F, it includes individual cartridge adapters.

=== K100F MK7 ===
6mm Flobert version, which includes adapters into which the cartridges are inserted.

The magazine holds 10 rounds, and reloading is manual, as this cartridge does not generate sufficient power to cycle the action via blowback on its own.

=== K22S/K22 X-Trim ===
Two .22lr versions of the K100. The K22S has fixed sights, and the K22 X-Trim has adjustable sights.

Both are manufactured on the same steel chassis and grip of the center-fire models, and have steel not zinc alloy slides.

They are stand alone firearms, not conversion kits. Using a direct blowback system rather than the rotary lock up, the rimfire barrels are dovetailed and pinned into the steel chassis.

=== P1 ===
93 mm barrel and matching slide using the same frame.

=== P1S ===
93 mm barrel and matching slide using the subcompact P11 frame/grip.

=== P1 Ultra ===
Scalloped slide and exposed 93 mm barrel using the same frame. 40 g lighter than the P1.

=== P11 ===
85 mm barrel and matching slide with subcompact frame/grip and 12-round magazine.

=== P9M ===
93 mm barrel chambered in 9mm Makarov and matching slide using the same frame.

=== X-Trim ===
Sporting version of the K100 with a scalloped slide and tighter fit. No firing pin block.

=== Target ===
Adjustable-sight version of the K100 featuring a micrometric adjustable rear and fiber optic front sight.

=== X-Calibur ===
For 2012, a new model with a longer fluted bull barrel and scalloped slide was introduced. Felt recoil and front sight lift is noticeably reduced. No firing pin block.

=== P40/P45 ===
For 2013, a new larger grip frame sized to fit the .45 ACP cartridge was introduced. The P40 is chambered in .40 S&W, 10mm Auto and .357 SIG. The P45 is chambered in .45 ACP. Using the same rotary locking barrel system, and the same 108 mm barrel length, the larger-caliber guns use many of the same proven components of the 9mm models.

=== P40L/P45L ===
For 2014, a 127mm/5-inch barrel and corresponding slide model was added to the larger caliber line up. The P40L is chambered in .40 S&W, 10mm Auto and .357 SIG.

=== Q100 ===
striker fired version of the K100 intended primarily for armed forces and self-defense.

The Q100 has a 108mm barrel and the same modular grip as the K100. The initial version will be in 9x19.

=== Q1/Q1S ===
Features a shorter slide and barrel than the Q100, either on the standard full sized grip (Q1) or combined with the subcompact grip shared with the P11 and P1S (Q1S).

==== Specs ====
Model	Cartridge	Magazine capacity	Length	Height	Width	Barrel length	Weight
G9F 4 mm	4 mm Flobert Short	15	190 mm (7.5 in)	140 mm (5.5 in)	37 mm (1.5 in)	117 mm (4.6 in)	700 g (25 oz)
G9F 6 mm	6 mm Flobert/6 mm ME Flobert	15	202.5 mm (7.97 in)	133.5 mm (5.26 in)	36 mm (1.4 in)	103 mm (4.1 in)	830 g (29 oz)
K100F MK7	6 mm Flobert/6 mm ME Flobert	10	204 mm (8.0 in)	140 mm (5.5 in)	37 mm (1.5 in)	108 mm (4.3 in)	825 g (29.1 oz)
K100	9x19 mm Parabellum	15	202.5 mm (7.97 in)	133.5 mm (5.26 in)	36 mm (1.4 in)	108 mm (4.3 in)	820 g (29 oz)
X-Calibur	9x19 mm Parabellum	15	220 mm (8.7 in)	133.5 mm (5.26 in)	36 mm (1.4 in)	126.7 mm (4.99 in)	885 g (31.2 oz)
Q100	9x19 mm Parabellum	15	202 mm (8.0 in)	133 mm (5.2 in)	34 mm (1.3 in)	96 mm (3.8 in)	760 g (27 oz)
Q1	9x19 mm Parabellum	15	187 mm (7.4 in)	133 mm (5.2 in)	34 mm (1.3 in)	96 mm (3.8 in)	680 g (24 oz)
P45	.45 ACP	10	206.5 mm (8.13 in)	137.5 mm (5.41 in)	36 mm (1.4 in)	108 mm (4.3 in)	847 g (29.9 oz)
P45L	.45 ACP	10	228 mm (9.0 in)	136 mm (5.4 in)	36 mm (1.4 in)	127 mm (5.0 in)	945 g (33.3 oz)
P40	.40 S&"; 10mm auto.357 SIG	14	206.5 mm (8.13 in)	135.5 mm (5.33 in)	36 mm (1.4 in)	108 mm (4.3 in)	880 g (31 oz)
P40L	.40 S&"; 10mm auto.357 SIG	14	228 mm (9.0 in)	136 mm (5.4 in)	36 mm (1.4 in)	127 mm (5.0 in)	985 g (34.7 oz)
P45L	.45 ACP	10	228 mm (9.0 in)	136 mm (5.4 in)	36 mm (1.4 in)	127 mm (5.0 in)	945 g (33.3 oz)
P380	.380 ACP	15	189 mm (7.4 in)	133.5 mm (5.26 in)	36 mm (1.4 in)	105 mm (4.1 in)	780 g (28 oz)
P11	9x19mm Parabellum	12	179 mm (7.0 in)	118 mm (4.6 in)	36 mm (1.4 in)	85 mm (3.3 in)	737 g (26.0 oz)
P1	9x19mm Parabellum	15	187.5 mm (7.38 in)	133.5 mm (5.26 in)	36 mm (1.4 in)	93 mm (3.7 in)	770 g (27 oz)
K22S	.22 LR	10	211.5 mm (8.33 in)	133.5 mm (5.26 in)	36 mm (1.4 in)	127 mm (5.0 in)	720 g (25 oz)

== Users ==
- Slovakia
