= QPQ =

QPQ may refer to:

- Quid pro quo, Latin phrase meaning something for something
- Quench polish quench (QPQ), a process for hardening steel
