= Slovenská Ľupča =

- Municipality
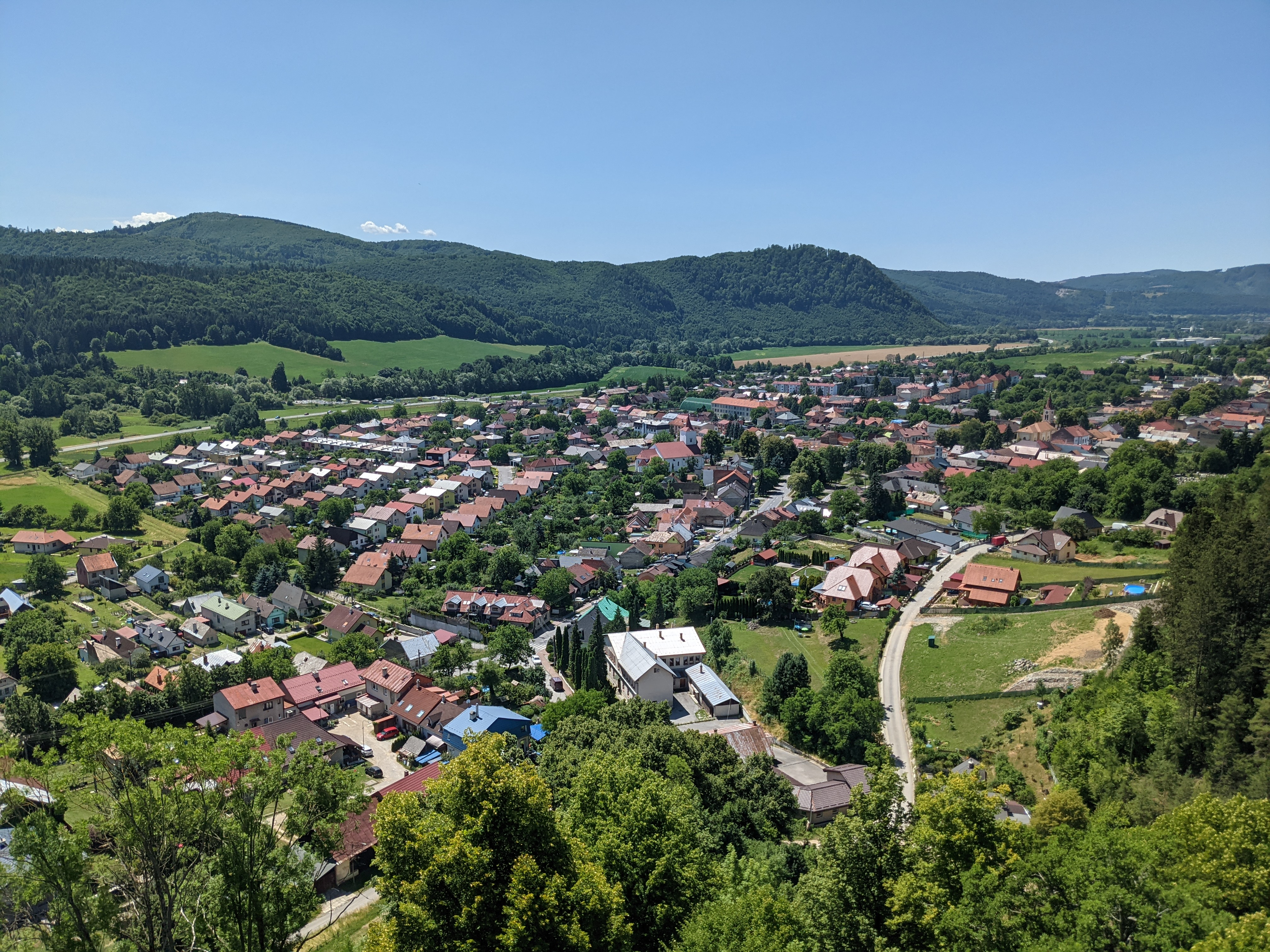

- Flag

- Location of Slovenská Ľupča in the Banská Bystrica Region Location of Slovenská Ľupča in Slovakia
- Coordinates: 48.74°N 19.25°E
- Country: Slovakia
- Region: Banská Bystrica Region
- District: Banská Bystrica District
- First mentioned: 1250

Government
  - Mayor: Roland Lamper

Area
  - Total: 32.32 km^{2} (12.48 sq mi)
- Elevation: 374 m (1,227 ft)

Population (2025)
  - Total: 3,259
- Time zone: UTC+1 (CET)
  - Summer (DST): UTC+2 (CEST)
- Postal code: 976 13
- Area code: +421 48
- Vehicle registration plate (until 2022): BB
- Website: www.slovenskalupca.sk

Slovenská Ľupča (Hungarian: Zólyomlipcse, German: Slowakisch Liptsch) is the largest village in the Banská Bystrica District of central Slovakia.

== Geography ==
The municipality lies at an altitude of 374 metres (1,227 ft) and covers an area of 32.32 km^{2} (12.48 sq mi) (2025).

The altitude of Slovenská Ľupča ranges from 370 to 699 metres, with the centre of the own residential area lying at 374 metres. The municipality covers an area of 32.32 km^{2}. It is situated about 10 km east of Banská Bystrica, in the Hron river valley. Slovenská Ľupča is part of two administrative units, the Banská Bystrica District and the Banská Bystrica Region.

== History ==
In historical records the village was first mentioned in 1250. It was founded on an ancient trade route Via Magna connecting Buda to Kraków. The settlement was built around two important political and social centers: a castle and a monastery. A favorite residence of the influential noble Magister Donč, Slovenská Ľupča was elevated to a town by Charles I in 1340. Slovenská Ľupča lost its town charter in the 19th century. The development of the village in the 20th century was connected with the large pharmaceutical factory Biotika built in 1953.

== Population ==
Population statistic (10 years)
Year	1995	2005	2015	2025
Count	2921	3119	3244	3259
Difference		+6.77%	+4.00%	+0.46%

Population statistic
Year	2024	2025
Count	3261	3259
Difference		−0.06%

It has a population of 3259 people (31 December 2025).

=== Ethnicity ===
Census 2021 (1+ %)
Ethnicity	Number	Fraction
Slovak	3116	95.43%
Not found out	125	3.82%
Romani	35	1.07%
Total	3265	

In year 2021 was 3265 people by ethnicity 3116 as Slovak, 125 as Not found out, 35 as Romani, 26 as Czech, 14 as Other, 10 as Hungarian, 5 as Rusyn, 4 as Russian, 4 as Polish, 4 as English, 3 as Moravian, 2 as Canadian, 1 as Vietnamese, 1 as Ukrainian, 1 as Italian, 1 as German and 1 as Greek.

Note on population: The difference values of population numbers in the table "Population statistic" and in the sections "Ethnicity" & "Religion" is caused by the use of various statistical methods.

=== Religion ===
Census 2021 (1+ %)
Religion	Number	Fraction
Roman Catholic Church	1555	47.63%
None	969	29.68%
Evangelical Church	464	14.21%
Not found out	164	5.02%
Total	3265	

In year 2021 was 3265 people by religion 1555 from Roman Catholic Church, 969 from None, 464 from Evangelical Church, 164 from Not found out, 29 from Greek Catholic Church, 27 from Other, 8 from Christian Congregations in Slovakia, 8 from Buddhism, 6 from Paganism and natural spirituality, 5 from Other and not ascertained christian church, 5 from Ad hoc movements, 4 from United Methodist Church, 3 from Eastern Orthodox Church, 3 from Jehovah's Witnesses, 3 from Church of the Brethren, 3 from Seventh-day Adventist Church, 3 from Apostolic Church, 2 from Old Catholic Church, 2 from Calvinist Church, 1 from Islam and 1 from Czechoslovak Hussite Church.

== Ľupča Castle ==
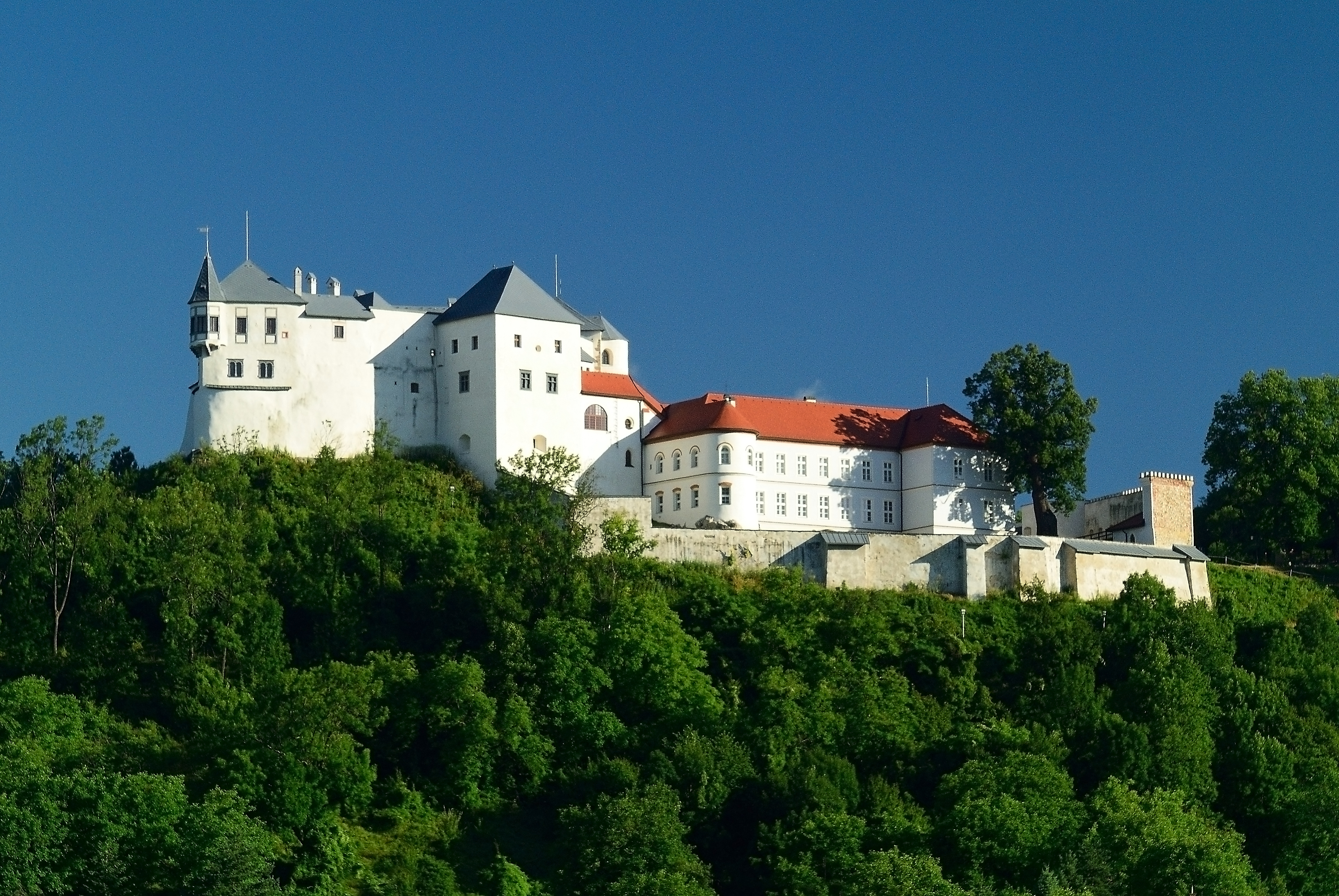
Ľupča Castle

Ľupča Castle (Slovak: Ľupčiansky hrad) was built in the Middle Ages to protect an important trade route along the Hron river. It was a favorite hunting resort of King Béla IV, who signed the royal town privileges of Banská Bystrica in the castle in 1255. Other monarchs who frequently resided in the castle were King Charles I, King Louis the Great, Emperor Sigismund, and King Matthias Corvinus. The castle hosted an orphanage from 1873 to 1938.

== Other landmarks ==
Kláštorisko is an open-air museum with ruins of a medieval monastery. We do not know when the monastery was founded, but it certainly existed by 1263. Its great supporter Magister Donč was interred there in the 14th century. The monastery was abandoned in the 17th century.

The Holy Trinity The Church of the Most Holy Trinity, three-lane Gothic building with a polygonal ended presbytery and a tower forming part of the mass of the church from the period after 1370. It is situated in a fenced area in the middle of the village. The church underwent a late-Gothic reconstruction in 1470, when the presbytery was newly rebuilt by a vaulted vault. From the Gothic details, windows with stone treads, a cross vault with ornate consoles and studs, and a non-gothic pastorphony were preserved in the church. Another significant adaptation was made in 1575 for Paul Rubigall, who adapted the church to a Renaissance triple. Around the year 1618 the annexation of the Tribell funeral chapel was built on the north side of the church. The church remained for almost two hundred years during the Reformation.

A "plague column" (Slovak: Morový stĺp) was erected in the 18th century in thanksgiving to the Virgin Mary for ending a deadly outbreak of plague. It is located in front of the Lutheran church.

== Economy ==
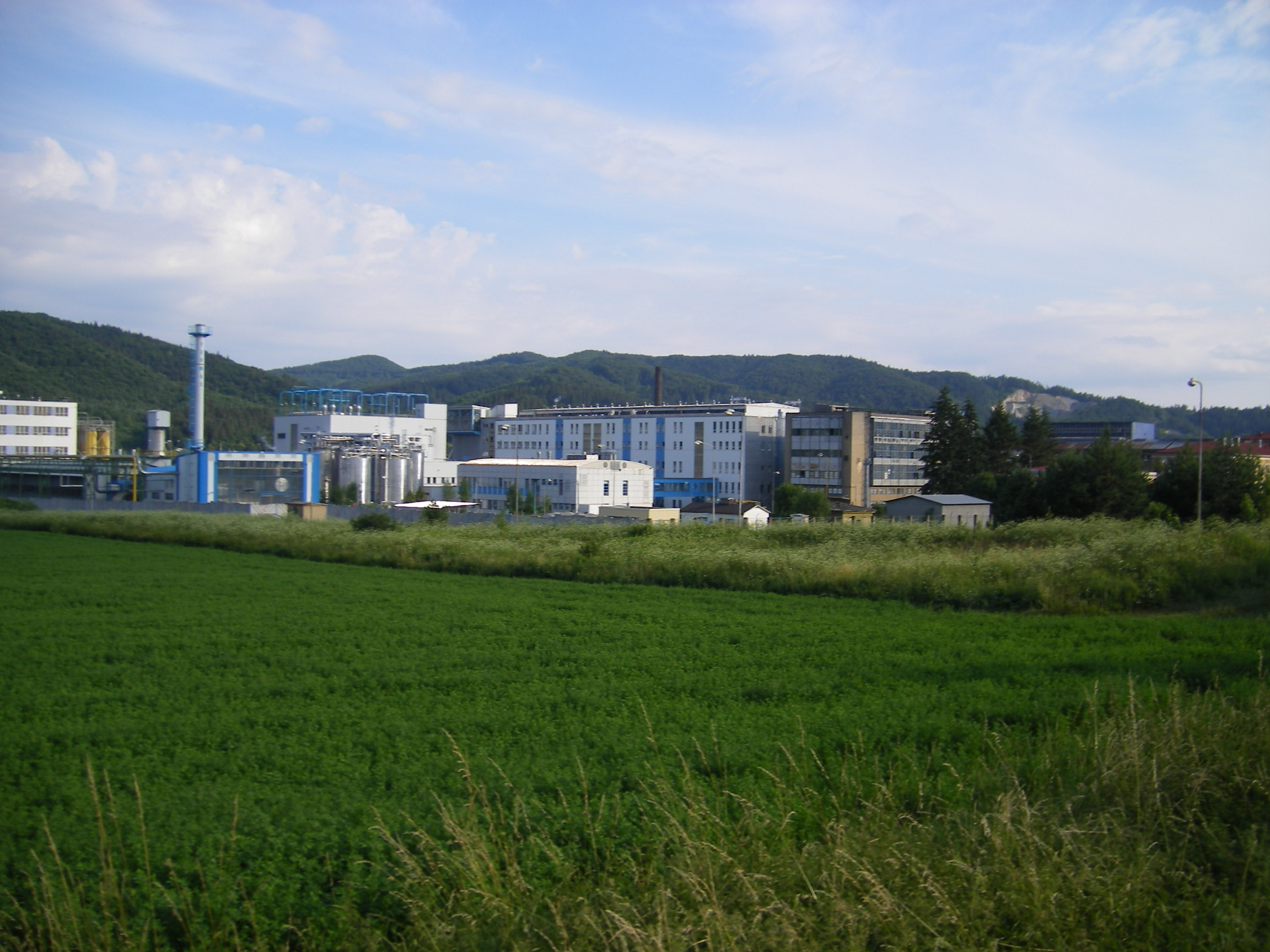
Pharmaceutical factory Biotika near Slovenská Ľupča

A pharmaceutical factory Biotika is located near the village.

Grand Power s.r.o. is a firearms manufacturer located nearby known for developing the Grand Power K100.

== Famous people ==
- Ferenc Wesselényi (1605–1667), count, palatine of Hungary
- Samuel Czambel (1856–1909), linguist, translator and philologist
- Emil Belluš (1899–1979), architect

== Partner towns ==
- Partizánska Ľupča, Slovakia
- Neuhofen an der Ybbs, Austria
- Široké, Slovakia
- Vlčany, Slovakia
