= Carbonitriding =

Surface hardening process

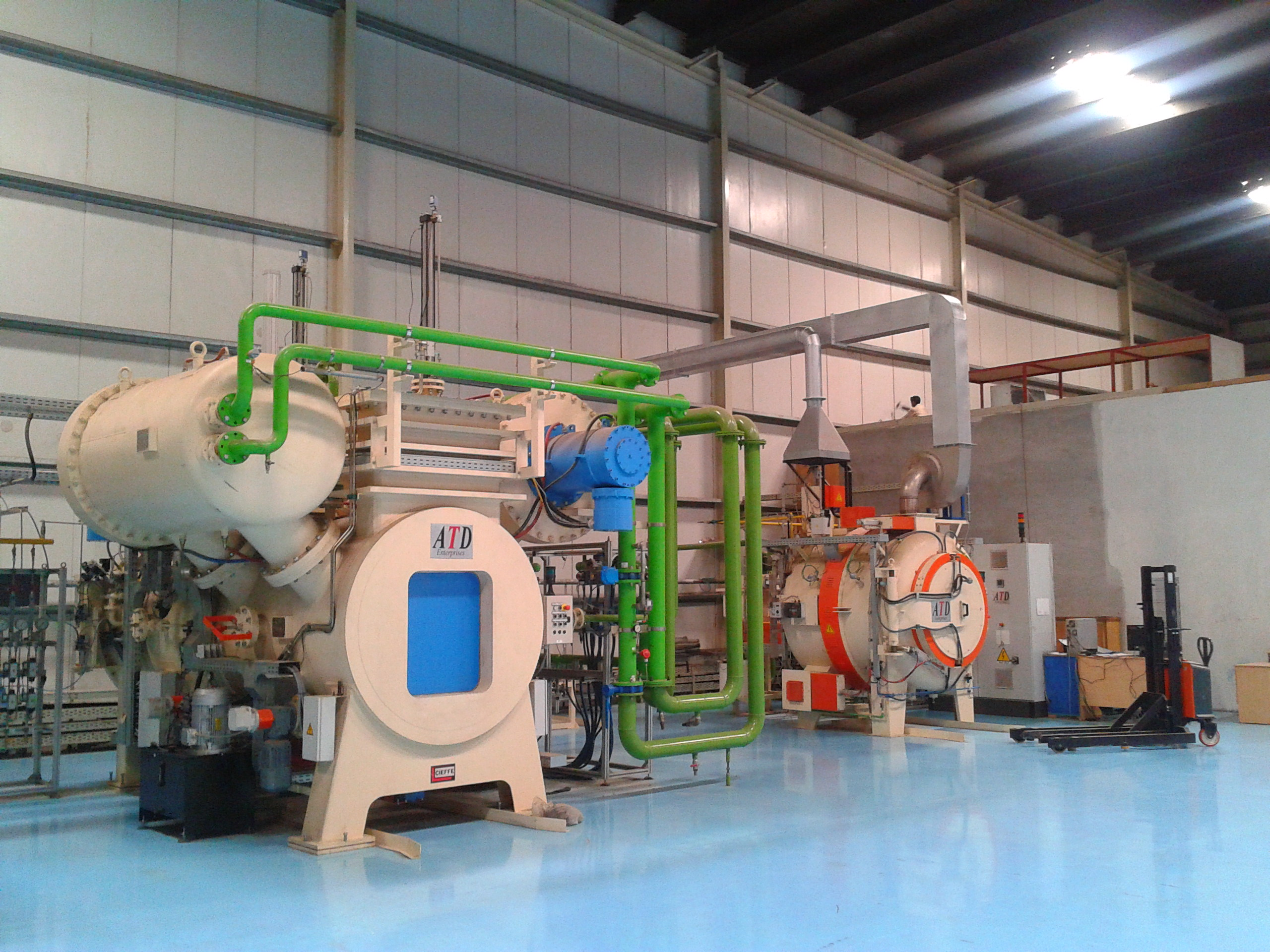
A modern nitriding, carburizing and carbonitriding furnace

Carbonitriding is a metallurgical surface modification technique that is used to increase the surface hardness of a metal, thereby reducing wear.

During the process, atoms of carbon and nitrogen diffuse interstitially into the metal, creating barriers to slip, increasing the hardness and modulus near the surface. Carbonitriding is often applied to inexpensive, easily machined low-carbon steel to impart the surface properties of more expensive and difficult to work grades of steel. Surface hardness of carbonitrided parts ranges from 55 to 62 HRC.

Certain pre-industrial case hardening processes include not only carbon-rich materials such as charcoal, but nitrogen-rich materials such as urea, which implies that traditional surface hardening techniques were a form of carbonitriding.

== Process ==
Carbonitriding is similar to gas carburization with the addition of ammonia to the carburizing atmosphere, which provides a source of nitrogen. Nitrogen is absorbed at the surface and diffuses into the workpiece along with carbon. Carbonitriding (around 850 °C / 1550 °F) is carried out at temperatures substantially higher than plain nitriding (around 530 °C / 990 °F) but slightly lower than those used for carburizing (around 950 °C / 1700 °F) and for shorter times. Carbonitriding tends to be more economical than carburizing, and also reduces distortion during quenching. The lower temperature allows oil quenching, or even gas quenching with a protective atmosphere.

== Characteristics of carbonitrided parts ==
Carbonitriding forms a hard, wear-resistant case, is typically 0.07 mm to 0.5 mm thick, and generally has higher hardness than a carburized case. Case depth is tailored to the application; a thicker case increases the wear life of the part. Carbonitriding alters only the top layers of the workpiece; and does not deposit an additional layer, so the process does not significantly alter the dimensions of the part.

Maximum case depth is typically restricted to 0.75 mm; case depths greater than this take too long to diffuse to be economical. Shorter processing times are preferred to restrict the concentration of nitrogen in the case, as nitrogen addition is more difficult to control than carbon. An excess of nitrogen in the work piece can cause high levels of retained austenite and porosity, which are undesirable in producing a part of high hardness.

== Advantages ==
Carbonitriding also has other advantages over carburizing. To begin, it has a greater resistance to softening during tempering and increased fatigue and impact strength. It is possible to use both carbonitriding and carburizing together to form optimum conditions of deeper case depths and therefore performance of the part in industry. This method is applied particularly to steels with low case hardenability, such as the seat of the valve. The process applied is initially carburizing to the required case depth (up to 2.5 mm) at around 900-955°C, and then carbonitriding to achieve required carbonitrided case depth. The parts are then oil quenched, and the resulting part has a harder case than possibly achieved for carburization, and the addition of the carbonitrided layer increases the residual compressive stresses in the case such that the contact fatigue resistance and strength gradient are both increased. Studies are showing that carbonitriding improves corrosion resistance.

== Applications ==
Typical applications for case hardening are gear teeth, cams, shafts, bearings, fasteners, pins, hydraulic piston rods, automotive clutch plates, tools, dies and tillage tools.

== See also ==
- Differential hardening
- Nitridization
- Quench polish quench
- Surface engineering
