= Ferritic nitrocarburizing =

Type of hardening with nitrogen and carbon using a salt bath

Ferritic nitrocarburizing or FNC, also known by the proprietary names "Tenifer", "Tufftride", Melonite, and "Arcor", (Note: Other trade names include Tuffride/ Tuffrider, QPQ, Sulfinuz, Sursulf, Meli 1, and Nitride, among others) is a range of proprietary case hardening processes that diffuse nitrogen and carbon into ferrous metals at sub-critical temperatures during a salt bath. Other methods of ferritic nitrocarburizing include gaseous processes such as Nitrotec and ion (plasma) ones. The processing temperature ranges from 525 °C (977 °F) to 625 °C (1,157 °F), but usually occurs at 565 °C (1,049 °F). Steel and other ferrous alloys remain in the ferritic phase region at this temperature. This allows for better control of the dimensional stability that would not be present in case hardening processes that occur when the alloy is transitioned into the austenitic phase. There are four main classes of ferritic nitrocarburizing: gaseous, salt bath, ion or plasma, and fluidized-bed.

The process improves three main surface integrity aspects: scuffing resistance, fatigue properties, and corrosion resistance. It has the advantage of inducing little shape distortion during the hardening process. This is because of the low processing temperature, which reduces thermal shocks and avoids phase transitions in steel.

== History ==
The first ferritic nitrocarburizing methods were done at low temperatures, around 550 °C (1,022 °F), in a liquid salt bath. The first company to successfully commercialize the process was the Imperial Chemical Industries in Great Britain. ICI called their process "the cassel" due to the plant where it was developed or "Sulfinuz" treatment because it had sulfur in the salt bath. While the process was very successful with high-speed spindles and cutting tools, there were issues with cleaning the solution off because it was not very water-soluble.

Because of the cleaning issues, Lucas Industries began experimenting with gaseous forms of ferritic nitrocarburizing in the late 1950s. The company applied for a patent in 1961. It produced a similar surface finish as the Sulfinuz process, except for the formation of sulfides. The atmosphere consists of ammonia, hydrocarbon gases, and a small amount of other carbon-containing gases.

This innovation spurred the development of a more environmentally friendly salt bath process by the German company Degussa after acquiring ICI patents. Their process is widely known as the Tufftride or Tenifer process. Following this, the ion nitriding process was invented in the early 1980s. This process had faster cycle times, required less cleaning and preparation, formed deeper cases, and allowed for better control of the process.

== Processes ==
Despite the naming, the process is a modified form of nitriding and not carburizing. The shared attribute of this class of this process is the introduction of nitrogen and carbon in the ferritic state of the material. The processes are divided into four main classes: gaseous, salt bath, ion or plasma, or fluidized-bed. The trade name and patented processes may vary slightly from the general description, but they are all a form of ferritic nitrocarburizing.

=== Salt bath ferritic nitrocarburizing ===
Salt bath ferritic nitrocarburizing is also known as liquid ferritic nitrocarburizing or liquid nitrocarburizing and is also known by the trademarked names "Tufftride" and "Tenifer".

The simplest form of this process is encompassed by the trademarked "Melonite" process, also known as "Meli 1". It is most commonly used on steels, sintered irons, and cast irons to lower friction and improve wear and corrosion resistance.

The process uses a salt bath of alkali cyanate. This is contained in a steel pot that has an aeration system. The cyanate thermally reacts with the surface of the workpiece to form an alkali carbonate. The bath is then treated to convert the carbonate back to a cyanate. The surface formed from the reaction has a compound layer and a diffusion layer. The compound layer formed consists of iron, nitrogen, and oxygen and is abrasion resistant and stable at elevated temperatures. The diffusion layer contains nitrides and carbides. The surface hardness ranges from 800 to 1500 HV depending on the steel grade. This also inversely affects the depth of the case; i.e., a high-carbon steel will form a hard, but shallow case.

A similar process is the trademarked "Nu-Tride" process, also known incorrectly as the "Kolene" process (which is the company's name), includes a preheat and an intermediate quench cycle. The intermediate quench is an oxidizing salt bath at 400 °C (752 °F). This quench is held for 5 to 20 minutes before the final quenching to room temperature. This is done to minimize distortion and to destroy any lingering cyanates or cyanides left on the workpiece.

Other trademarked processes are "Sursulf" and "Tenoplus". Sursulf has a sulfur compound in the salt bath to create surface sulfides creating porosity in the workpiece surface. This porosity is used to contain lubrication. Tenoplus is a two-stage high-temperature process. The first stage occurs at 625 °C (1,157 °F), while the second stage occurs at 580 °C (1,076 °F).

=== Gaseous ferritic nitrocarburizing ===
Gaseous ferritic nitrocarburizing is also known as controlled nitrocarburizing, soft nitriding, and vacuum nitrocarburizing. The process works to achieve the same result as the salt bath process, except gaseous mixtures are used to diffuse the nitrogen and carbon into the workpiece.

The parts are first cleaned, usually with a vapor degreasing process, and then nitrocarburized around 570 °C (1,058 °F), with a processing time that ranges from one to four hours. The actual gas mixtures are proprietary, but they usually contain ammonia and an endothermic gas.

In comparison to a standard nitriding process, ferritic nitrocarburizing or FNC in a vacuum furnace takes less time to achieve case depth requirements - mainly in part due to the addition of carbon to achieve faster diffusion.

=== Plasma-assisted ferritic nitrocarburizing ===
Plasma-assisted ferritic nitrocarburizing is also known as ion nitriding, plasma ion nitriding, or glow-discharge nitriding. The process works to achieve the same result as the salt bath and gaseous process, except the reactivity of the media is not due to the temperature but to the gas ionized state. In this technique intense electric fields are used to generate ionized molecules of the gas around the surface to diffuse the nitrogen and carbon into the workpiece. Such highly active gas with ionized molecules is called plasma, naming the technique. The gas used for plasma nitriding is usually pure nitrogen since no spontaneous decomposition is needed (as is the case of gaseous ferritic nitrocarburizing with ammonia). Due to the relatively low-temperature range (420 °C (788 °F) to 580 °C (1,076 °F)) generally applied during plasma-assisted ferritic nitrocarburizing and gentle cooling in the furnace, the distortion of workpieces can be minimized. Stainless steel workpieces can be processed at moderate temperatures (like 420 °C (788 °F)) without the formation of chromium nitride precipitates and hence maintaining their corrosion resistance properties.

=== Post-oxidation black oxide ===
An additional step can be added to the nitrocarburizing process called post-oxidation. When properly performed, post-oxidation creates a layer of black oxide (Fe_{3}O_{4}), that greatly increases the corrosion resistance of the treated substrate while leaving an aesthetically attractive black color. Since the introduction of the Glock pistol in 1982, this type of nitrocarburizing with post-oxidation finish has become popular as a factory finish for military-style handguns.

This combination of nitrocarburizing and oxidizing is sometimes called "nitrox", but this word also has another meaning.

== Uses ==
These processes are most commonly used on low-carbon, low-alloy steels. However, they are also used on medium and high-carbon steels. Typical applications include spindles, cams, gears, dies, hydraulic piston rods, and powdered metal components.

One of the initial applications of the hardening process for mass-produced automobile engines was by Kaiser-Jeep for the crankshaft in the 1962 Jeep Tornado engine. This was one of many innovations in the OHC six-cylinder engine. The crankshaft was strengthened by Tufftriding in a unique salt bath for two hours at 1,025 °F (552 °C) that, according to Kaiser-Jeep, increased engine life by 50% and also made the journal surfaces hard enough to be compatible with heavy-duty tri-metal engine bearings.

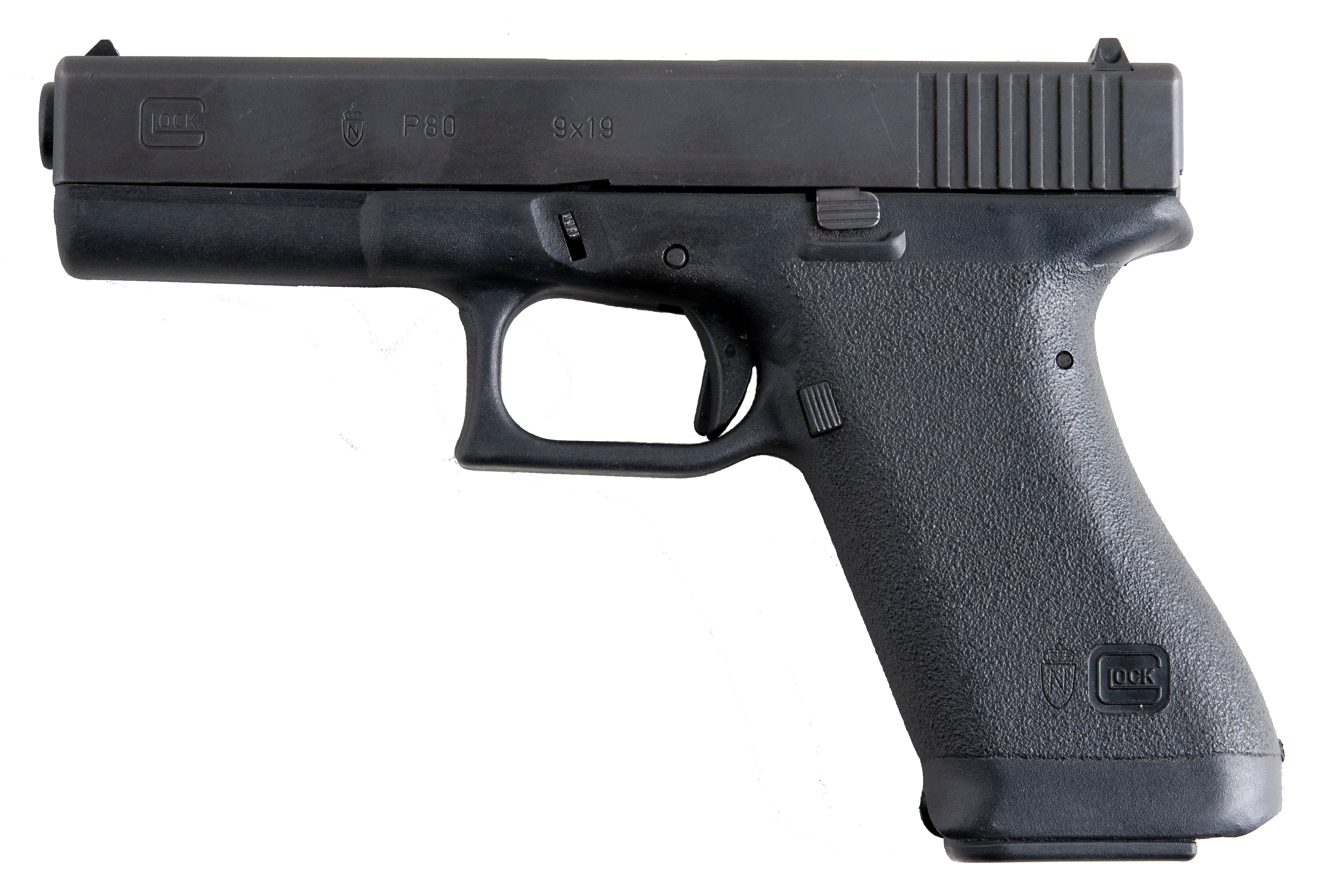
A first-generation Glock 17 adopted in 1985 by the Norwegian Armed Forces under the P80 designation

Glock Ges.m.b.H., an Austrian firearms manufacturer, utilized the Tenifer process until 2010, to protect the barrels and slides of the pistols they manufacture. The finish on a Glock pistol is the third and final hardening process. It is 0.05 mm (0.0020 in) thick and produces a 64 Rockwell C hardness rating via a 500 °C (932 °F) nitride bath. The final matte, non-glare finish meets or exceeds stainless steel specifications, is 85% more corrosion resistant than a hard chrome finish, and is 99.9% salt-water corrosion resistant. After the Tenifer process, a black Parkerized finish is applied and the slide is protected even if the finish were to wear off. In 2010, Glock switched to a gaseous ferritic nitrocarburizing process. Besides Glock other pistol and other firearms manufacturers, including Smith & Wesson and HS Produkt, also use ferritic nitrocarburizing for finishing parts like barrels and slides, but they call it Melonite finish. Heckler & Koch use a nitrocarburizing process they refer to as Hostile Environment. Pistol manufacturer Caracal International, headquartered in the United Arab Emirates, uses ferritic nitrocarburizing for finishing parts such as barrels and slides with the plasma-based post-oxidation process (PlasOx). Grand Power, a Slovak firearms producer, also uses a quench polish quench (QPQ) treatment to harden metal parts on its K100 pistols.
