= Grand Power Stribog =

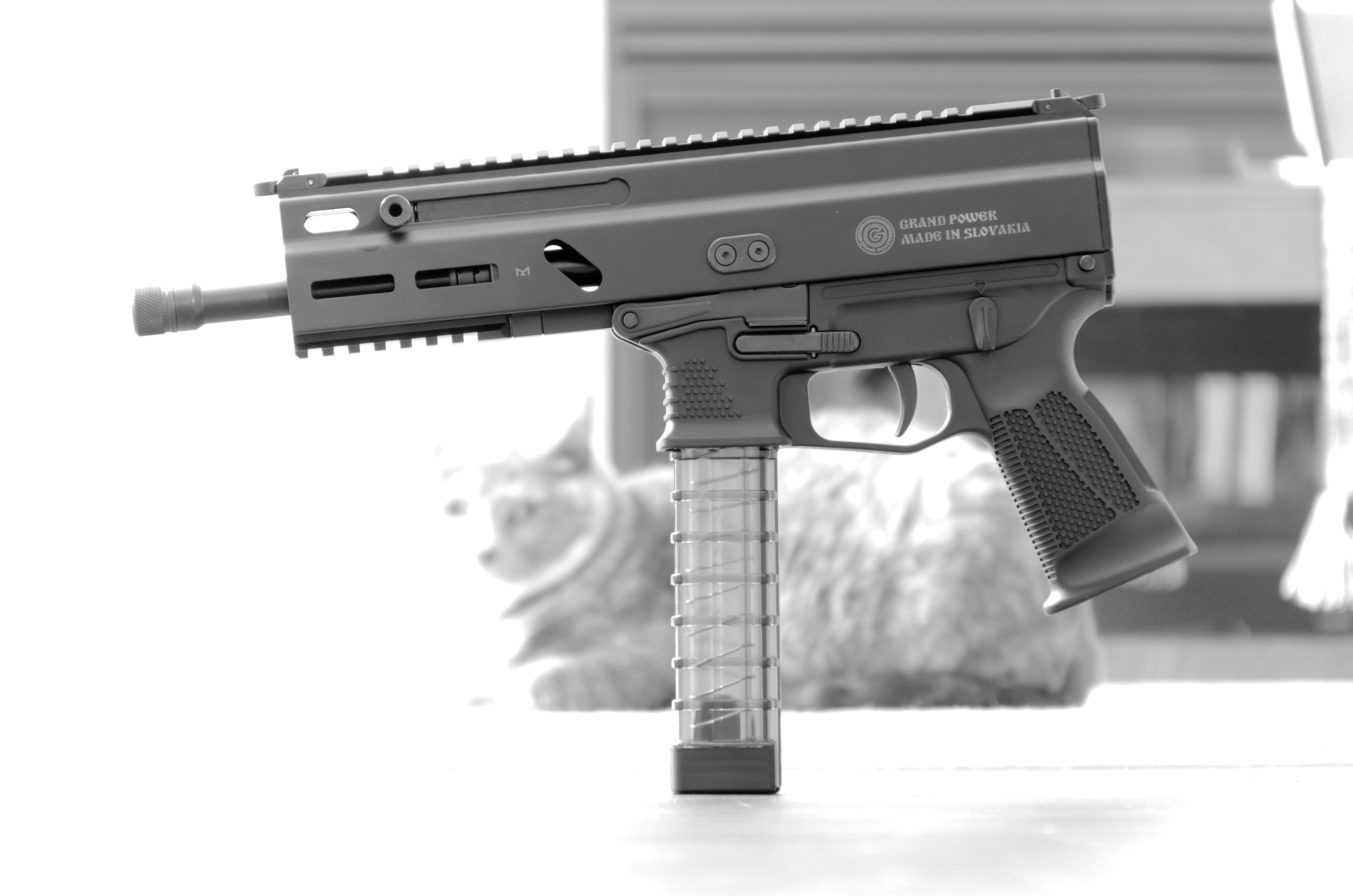
- Stribog SP9A1 pistol
- Type: Submachine gun Semi-automatic pistol Pistol-caliber carbine
- Place of origin: Slovakia

Production history
- Manufacturer: Grand Power s.r.o.
- Produced: 2016-present

Specifications
- Mass: 1,952 g (4.303 lb)-2,650 g (5.84 lb)
- Length: 316 mm (12.4 in)-915 mm (36.0 in)
- Barrel length: 205 mm (8.1 in)-410 mm (16 in)
- Width: 57 mm (2.2 in)
- Cartridge: 6 mm Flobert.22 long rifle 7.62 mm Tokarev.380 ACP; 9×19mm Parabellum; 10mm Auto.45 ACP
- Action: Blowback
- Feed system: 10, 20, 25, 30 or 32 detachable magazine
- Sights: Adjustable

The Grand Power Stribog is a line of semi-automatic firearms and submachine guns available in various calibers, manufactured in Slovakia by the company Grand Power s.r.o.

== Development ==
Introduced in 2016 at the I.W.A. 2016 event, its name honors the Slavic god of wind, Stribog.

== Design ==
The Stribog's aesthetics are very similar to the B&T APC-9.

The Stribog features a polymer grip and AR-15 style fire selector, with a top Picatinny rail mounted on a 7075 aluminum receiver that runs from the stock to the front sight, as well as a lower Picatinny rail that can mount anything from handguards to optics.

The trigger requires a pull of 7.7 pounds, and it also has a folding stock and is compatible with 10, 20, or 30-round magazines.

== Variants ==
According to manufacturer.

=== SP9 A1 ===
9mm Parabellum caliber version with a direct blowback action with a reciprocating charging handle

=== SP9 A2 ===
9mm Parabellum caliber version with a direct blowback system with a non-reciprocating charging handle

=== SP9 A2/3F ===
6mm Flobert version; these rounds are fired using individual rimfire adapters, which can also be used in the Flobert versions of the GP K100.

=== TR22 ===
.22 LR caliber version available in three different barrel lengths: 10, 12, and 16.5 inches.

=== TR22 Pistol ===
Stockless version of the TR22, available only with the 10-inch barrel.

=== TT ===
7.62mm Tokarev caliber version; production was limited to just 100 units.

=== SP380 ===
.380 ACP caliber version.

=== SP9 A3 ===
9mm Parabellum caliber version with a roller delayed action

=== SP9 A3S ===
Shortened version of the SP9 A3.

=== SR9 A3 ===
Extended-barrel version of the SP9 A3.

=== RSR9 A3 ===
Extended version of the SR9 A3; its appearance resembles an assault rifle more than a submachine gun, though it still uses the 9mm Parabellum cartridge.

=== SP10 ===
Version chambered for the 10mm Auto cartridge.

=== SP45 ===
.45 ACP caliber version.

Model	Cartridge	Capacity (cartridges)	Length (folded stock)	Length (extended stock)	Width	Barrel length	Weight
SP9 A2F; SP9 A3F	6 mm Flobert	10 / 30	400 mm (16 in)	660 mm (26 in)	nd	200 mm (7.9 in)	2,650 g (5.84 lb)
TR22	.22 Long Rifle	25	456 mm (18.0 in); 506 mm (19.9 in); 621 mm (24.4 in)	720 mm (28 in); 770 mm (30 in); 885 mm (34.8 in)	57 mm (2.2 in)	10 in (250 mm); 12 in (300 mm); 16.5 in (420 mm)	2,335 g (5.148 lb); 2,400 g (5.3 lb); 2,530 g (5.58 lb)
TR22 Pistol	.22 Long Rifle	25	456 mm (18.0 in)	n/a	57 mm (2.2 in)	10 in (250 mm)	1,952 g (4.303 lb)
TT	7.62 mm Tokarev	32	430 mm (17 in)	694 mm (27.3 in)	n.d.	10 in (250 mm)	2,190 g (4.83 lb)
SP-380	.380 ACP	10 / 20 / 30	424 mm (16.7 in)	710 mm (28 in)	57 mm (2.2 in)	8 in (200 mm)	2,400 g (5.3 lb)
SP9 A3	9×19mm Parabellum	10 / 20 / 30	424 mm (16.7 in)	710 mm (28 in)	57 mm (2.2 in)	8 in (200 mm)	2,060 g (4.54 lb)
SP9 A3S	9×19mm Parabellum	10 / 20 / 30	316 mm (12.4 in)	579 mm (22.8 in)	57 mm (2.2 in)	8 in (200 mm)	2,360 g (5.20 lb)
SR9 A3	9×19mm Parabellum	10 / 20 / 30	475 mm (18.7 in)	761 mm (30.0 in)	57 mm (2.2 in)	10 in (250 mm)	2,460 g (5.42 lb)
RSR9 A3	9×19mm Parabellum	10 / 20 / 30	564 mm (22.2 in); 629 mm (24.8 in)	850 mm (33 in); 915 mm (36.0 in)	57 mm (2.2 in)	13 in (330 mm); 16 in (410 mm)	n.d.
SP10	10 mm Auto	20	469 mm (18.5 in)	728 mm (28.7 in)	57 mm (2.2 in)	8 in (200 mm)	2,468 g (5.441 lb)
SP45	.45 ACP	20	469 mm (18.5 in)	728 mm (28.7 in)	57 mm (2.2 in)	8 in (200 mm)	2,468 g (5.441 lb)

== Adoption ==
The Stribog was under evaluation by the Israeli army.

The Stribog AP9 A3S variant was submitted to be evaluated for the US Army's Sub Compact Weapon (SCW) program. However, Stribog eventually lost to the Brügger & Thomet APC9K.
