= Grand Power =

Firearms manufacturer

Grand Power s.r.o.
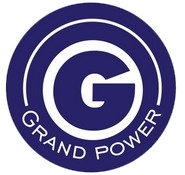
- Type: s.r.o.
- Industry: Defence
- Founded: 2002; 24 years ago
- Founder: Jaroslav Kuracina
- Headquarters: Banská Bystrica, Slovakia
- Area served: Worldwide
- Key people: Jaroslav Kuracina (CEO)
- Products: Firearms, ammunition, accessories
- Services: Import, export, trade, manufacturing
- Number of employees: 80
- Website: www.grandpower.eu

Grand Power s.r.o. is a Slovak defence supplier specializing in the design and manufacturing of firearms and tactical components such as sound suppressors.

== Overview ==
The company is based in Banská Bystrica.

The company exports almost 95% of its production. The remaining 5% are sold in Slovakia.

== Products ==
=== K100 ===
Grand Power is the manufacturer of the K100 pistol, known by their rare rotating barrel locking system.

=== Stribog ===
The Grand Power STRIBOG is under evaluation by the Israel army.

The Stribog AP9 A3S variant was submitted to be evaluated for the US Army's Sub Compact Weapon (SCW) program. However, Stribog eventually lost to the Brügger & Thomet APC9K.

=== M4M1 ===
The Grand Power M4M1 will replace the Vz.58 in the Slovak army as its service firearm.

The first rifles should be delivered to the soldiers in next year and the deliveries should be completed in 2028.

After the completion of deliveries, the army will be fielding around 26,000 M4M1 rifles.

== See also ==
- Grand Power K100
