= Case-hardening =

Process of hardening the surface of a metal object

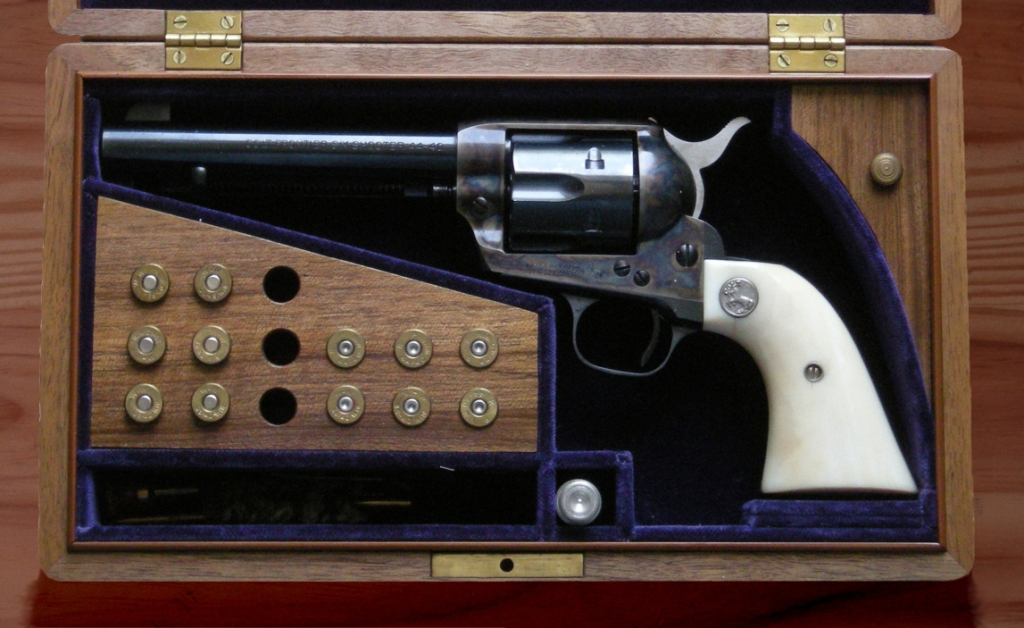
Colt Peacemaker, showing discoloration from case-hardening

Case-hardening or carburization is the process of introducing carbon to the surface of a low-carbon iron, or more commonly a low-carbon steel object, to harden the surface.

Iron which has a carbon content greater than ~0.02% is known as steel. Steel which has a carbon content greater than ~0.25% can be direct-hardened by heating to around 600 °C (1,112 °F), and then quickly cooling, often by immersing in water or oil, known as quenching. Hardening is desirable for metal components because it gives increased strength and wear resistance, the tradeoff being that hardened steel is generally more brittle and less malleable than when it is in a softer state.

In order to produce a hard skin on steels which have less than ~0.2% carbon, carbon can be introduced into the surface by heating steel in the presence of some carbon-rich substance such as powdered charcoal or hydrocarbon gas. This causes carbon to diffuse into the surface of the steel. The depth of this high carbon layer depends on the exposure time, but 0.5mm is a typical case depth. Once this has been done the steel must be heated and quenched to harden this higher carbon 'skin'. Below this skin, the steel core will remain soft due to its low carbon content.

== History ==
Early iron smelting made use of bloomeries which converted iron ore into metallic iron by heating it in a furnace which burnt wood and charcoal. Because the temperatures that could be achieved by this method were generally below the melting point of iron, it was not truly smelted, but instead converted into a spongy metallic iron/slag matrix. This matrix then required re-heating and hammering to extract as much of the slag as possible, in order to produce a low-carbon malleable wrought iron which could then be forged into tools etc. Due to its low carbon content, wrought iron is quite soft, so something like a knife blade could not be kept very sharp; it would blunt quickly and bend easily.

As smelting techniques improved, higher furnace temperatures could be achieved which were sufficient to fully melt iron. However, in the process, the iron picked up carbon from the charcoal or coke used to heat it. This resulted in molten iron with a carbon content of around 3%, which was termed cast iron. This liquid iron could be cast into complex shapes, but due to its high carbon content, it was very brittle, not at all malleable, and totally unsuitable for something like a knife blade. Further processing was required to remove the excess carbon from cast iron and create malleable wrought iron (the ultimate developments of this being the Bessemer converter and the Siemens process).

After the removal of almost all carbon from cast iron, the result was a metal that was very malleable and ductile but not very hard, nor capable of being hardened by heating and quenching. This led to the introduction of case hardening. The resulting case-hardened product combines much of the malleability and toughness of a low-carbon steel core with the hardness and resilience of the outer high-carbon steel skin.

The traditional method of applying the carbon to the surface of the iron involved packing the iron in a mixture of carbon-rich material such as ground bone and charcoal or a combination of leather, hooves, salt and urine, all inside a well-sealed box (the "case"). This carburizing package is then heated to a high temperature—but still under the melting point of the iron—and left at that temperature for a length of time. The longer the package is held at the high temperature, the deeper the carbon will diffuse into the surface. Different depths of hardening are desirable for different purposes: sharp tools need deep hardening to allow grinding and resharpening without exposing the soft core, while machine parts like gears might need only shallow hardening for increased wear resistance.

The resulting case-hardened part may show distinct surface discoloration, if the carbon material is mixed organic matter as described above. The steel darkens significantly and shows a mottled pattern of black, blue, and purple caused by the various compounds formed from impurities in the bone and charcoal. This oxide surface works similarly to bluing, providing a degree of corrosion resistance, as well as an attractive finish. Case colouring refers to this pattern and is commonly encountered as a decorative finish on firearms.

Case-hardened steel combines extreme hardness and extreme toughness, which is not readily matched by homogeneous alloys since hard homogeneous steels tend to be brittle, especially those steels whose hardness relies on carbon content alone. Alloy steels containing nickel, chromium, or molybdenum can have very high hardness, strength, or elongation values, but at a greater cost than a case-hardened item with a low-carbon core.

== Chemistry ==
Carbon itself is solid at case-hardening temperatures and so is immobile. Transport to the surface of the steel was as gaseous carbon monoxide, generated by the breakdown of the carburising compound and the oxygen packed into the sealed box. This takes place with pure carbon but too slowly to be workable. Although oxygen is required for this process it is re-circulated through the CO cycle and so can be carried out inside a sealed box (the "case"). The sealing is necessary to stop the CO either leaking out or being oxidised to CO_{2} by excess outside air.

Adding an easily decomposed carbonate "energiser" such as barium carbonate breaks down to BaO + CO_{2} and this encourages the reaction:

C (from the donor) + CO_{2} <—> 2 CO

increasing the overall abundance of CO and the activity of the carburising compound.

It is a common knowledge fallacy that case-hardening was done with bone but this is misleading. Although bone was used, the main carbon donor was hoof and horn. Bone contains some carbonates but is mainly calcium phosphate (as hydroxylapatite). This does not have the beneficial effect of encouraging CO production and it can also introduce phosphorus as an impurity into the steel alloy.

== Modern use ==
Both carbon and alloy steels are suitable for case-hardening; typically mild steels are used, with low carbon content, usually less than 0.3% (see plain-carbon steel for more information). These mild steels are not normally hardenable due to the low quantity of carbon, so the surface of the steel is chemically altered to increase the hardenability. Case-hardened steel is formed by diffusing carbon (carburization), nitrogen (nitriding) or boron (boriding) into the outer layer of the steel at high temperature, and then heat treating the surface layer to the desired hardness.

The term case-hardening is derived from the practicalities of the carburization process itself, which is essentially the same as the ancient process. The steel work piece is placed inside a case packed tight with a carbon-based case-hardening compound. This is collectively known as a carburizing pack. The pack is put inside a hot furnace for a variable length of time. Time and temperature determines how deep into the surface the hardening extends. However, the depth of hardening is ultimately limited by the inability of carbon to diffuse deeply into solid steel, and a typical depth of surface hardening with this method is up to 1.5 mm. Other techniques are also used in modern carburizing, such as heating in a carbon-rich atmosphere. Small items may be case-hardened by repeated heating with a torch and quenching in a carbon rich medium, such as the commercial products Kasenit / Casenite or "Cherry Red". Older formulations of these compounds contain potentially toxic cyanide compounds, while the more recent types such as Cherry Red do not.

== Processes ==
=== Flame or induction hardening ===
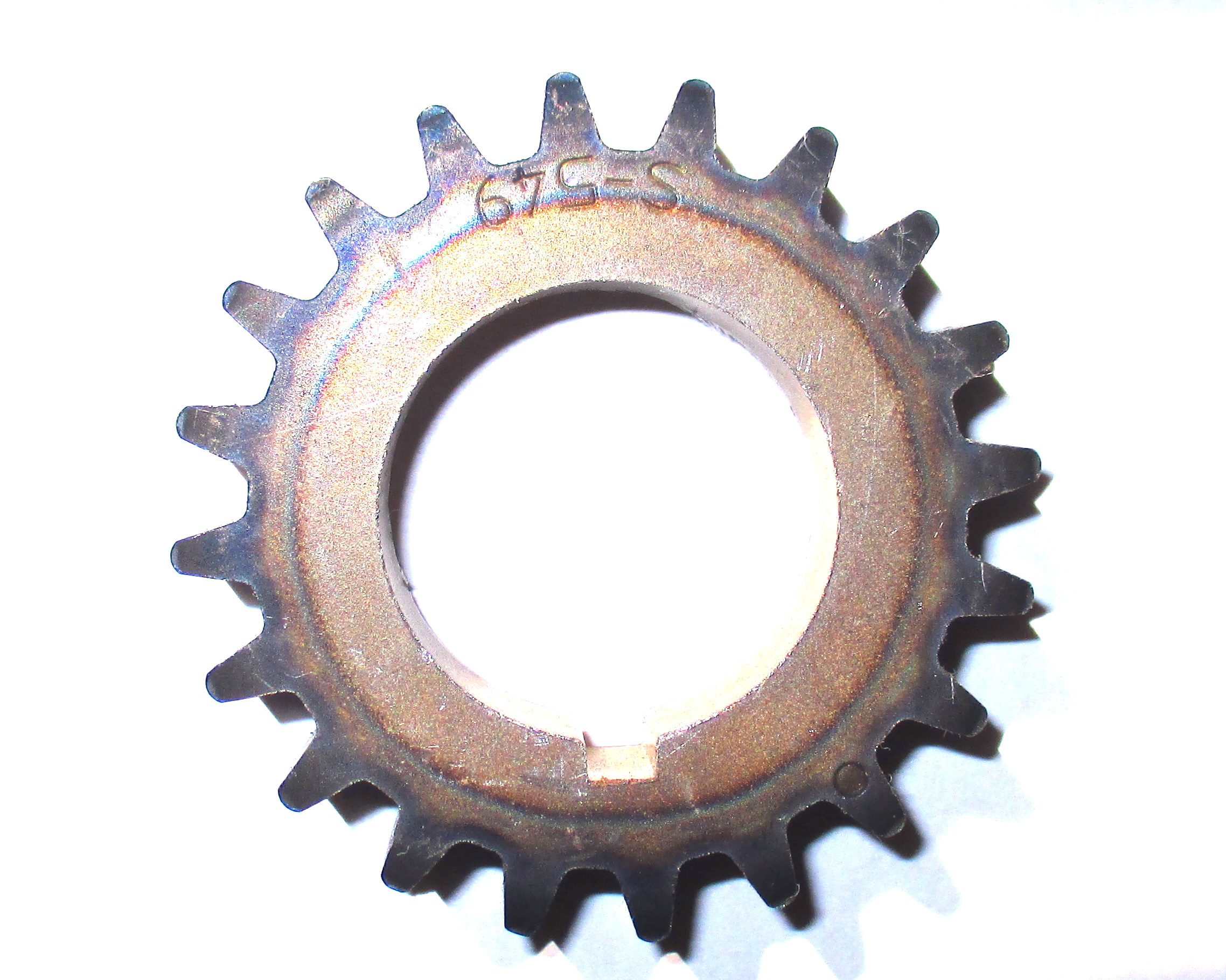
A flame-hardened sprocket. The discoloration around the teeth delineates the area that was rapidly heated and then quenched.

Flame or induction hardening are processes in which the surface of the steel is heated very rapidly to high temperatures (by direct application of an oxy-gas flame, or by induction heating) then cooled rapidly, generally using water; this creates a "case" of martensite on the surface. A carbon content of 0.3–0.6 wt% C is needed for this type of hardening. Unlike other methods, flame or induction hardening does not change chemical composition of the material. Because it is merely a localized heat-treatment process, they are typically only useful on high-carbon steels that will respond sufficiently to quench hardening.

Typical uses are for the shackle of a lock, where the outer layer is hardened to be file resistant, and mechanical gears, where hard gear mesh surfaces are needed to maintain a long service life while toughness is required to maintain durability and resistance to catastrophic failure. Flame hardening uses direct impingement of an oxy-gas flame onto a defined surface area. The result of the hardening process is controlled by four factors:

- Design of the flame head
- Duration of heating
- Target temperature to be reached
- Composition of the metal being treated

=== Carburizing ===
Carburizing is a process used to case-harden steel with a carbon content between 0.1 and 0.3 wt% C. In this process iron is introduced to a carbon rich environment at elevated temperatures for a certain amount of time, and then quenched so that the carbon is locked in the structure; one of the simpler procedures is repeatedly to heat a part with an acetylene torch set with a fuel-rich flame and quench it in a carbon-rich fluid such as oil.

Carburization is a diffusion-controlled process, so the longer the steel is held in the carbon-rich environment the greater the carbon penetration will be and the higher the carbon content. The carburized section will have a carbon content high enough that it can be hardened again through flame or induction hardening.

It is possible to carburize only a portion of a part, either by protecting the rest by a process such as copper plating, or by applying a carburizing medium to only a section of the part.

The carbon can come from a solid, liquid or gaseous source; if it comes from a solid source the process is called pack carburizing. Packing low-carbon steel parts with a carbonaceous material and heating for some time diffuses carbon into the outer layers. A heating period of a few hours might form a high-carbon layer about one millimeter thick.

Liquid carburizing involves placing parts in a bath of a molten carbon-containing material, often a metal cyanide; gas carburizing involves placing the parts in a furnace maintained with a methane-rich interior.

=== Nitriding ===
Nitriding heats the steel part to 482–621 °C (900–1,150 °F) in an atmosphere of ammonia gas and dissociated ammonia. The time the part spends in this environment dictates the depth of the case. The hardness is achieved by the formation of nitrides. Nitride forming elements must be present for this method to work; these elements include chromium, molybdenum, and aluminum. The advantage of this process is that it causes little distortion, so the part can be case-hardened after being quenched, tempered and machined. No quenching is done after nitriding.

=== Cyaniding ===
Cyaniding is a case-hardening process that is fast and efficient; it is mainly used on low-carbon steels. The part is heated to 871–954 °C (1,600–1,749 °F) in a bath of sodium cyanide and then is quenched and rinsed, in water or oil, to remove any residual cyanide.

2NaCN + O_{2} → 2NaCNO
2NaCNO + O_{2} → Na_{2}CO_{3} + CO + N_{2}
2CO → CO_{2} + C

This process produces a thin, hard shell (between 0.25 and 0.75 mm; 0.0098 and 0.0295 in) that is harder than the one produced by carburizing, and can be completed in 20 to 30 minutes compared to several hours so the parts have less opportunity to become distorted. It is typically used on small parts such as bolts, nuts, screws and small gears. The major drawback of cyaniding is that cyanide salts are poisonous.

=== Carbonitriding ===
Carbonitriding is similar to cyaniding except a gaseous atmosphere of ammonia and hydrocarbons is used instead of sodium cyanide. If the part is to be quenched, it is heated to 775–885 °C (1,427–1,625 °F); if not, then the part is heated to 649–788 °C (1,200–1,450 °F).

=== Ferritic nitrocarburizing ===
Ferritic nitrocarburizing diffuses mostly nitrogen and some carbon into the case of a workpiece below the critical temperature, approximately 650 °C (1,202 °F). Under the critical temperature the workpiece's microstructure does not convert to an austenitic phase, but stays in the ferritic phase, which is why it is called ferritic nitrocarburization.

== Applications ==
Parts that are subject to high pressures and sharp impacts are still commonly case-hardened. Examples include firing pins and rifle bolt faces, or engine camshafts. In these cases, the surfaces requiring the hardness may be hardened selectively, leaving the bulk of the part in its original tough state.

Firearms were a common item case-hardened in the past, as they required precision machining best done on low carbon alloys, yet needed the hardness and wear resistance of a higher carbon alloy. Many modern replicas of older firearms, particularly single action revolvers, are still made with case-hardened frames, or with case coloring, which simulates the mottled pattern left by traditional charcoal and bone case-hardening.

Another common application of case-hardening is on screws, particularly self-drilling screws. In order for the screws to be able to drill, cut and tap into other materials like steel, the drill point and the forming threads must be harder than the material(s) that it is drilling into. However, if the whole screw is uniformly hard, it will become very brittle and it will break easily. This is overcome by ensuring that only the surface is hardened, and the core remains relatively softer and thus less brittle. For screws and fasteners, case-hardening is achieved by a simple heat treatment consisting of heating and then quenching.

For theft prevention, lock shackles and chains are often case-hardened to resist cutting, whilst remaining less brittle inside to resist impact. As case-hardened components are difficult to machine, they are generally shaped before hardening.

== See also ==
- Differential hardening
- Diffusion hardening
- Quench polish quench
- Shot peening
- Surface engineering
- Von Stahel und Eysen
