= Nitriding =

Nitrogen diffusion case-hardening process

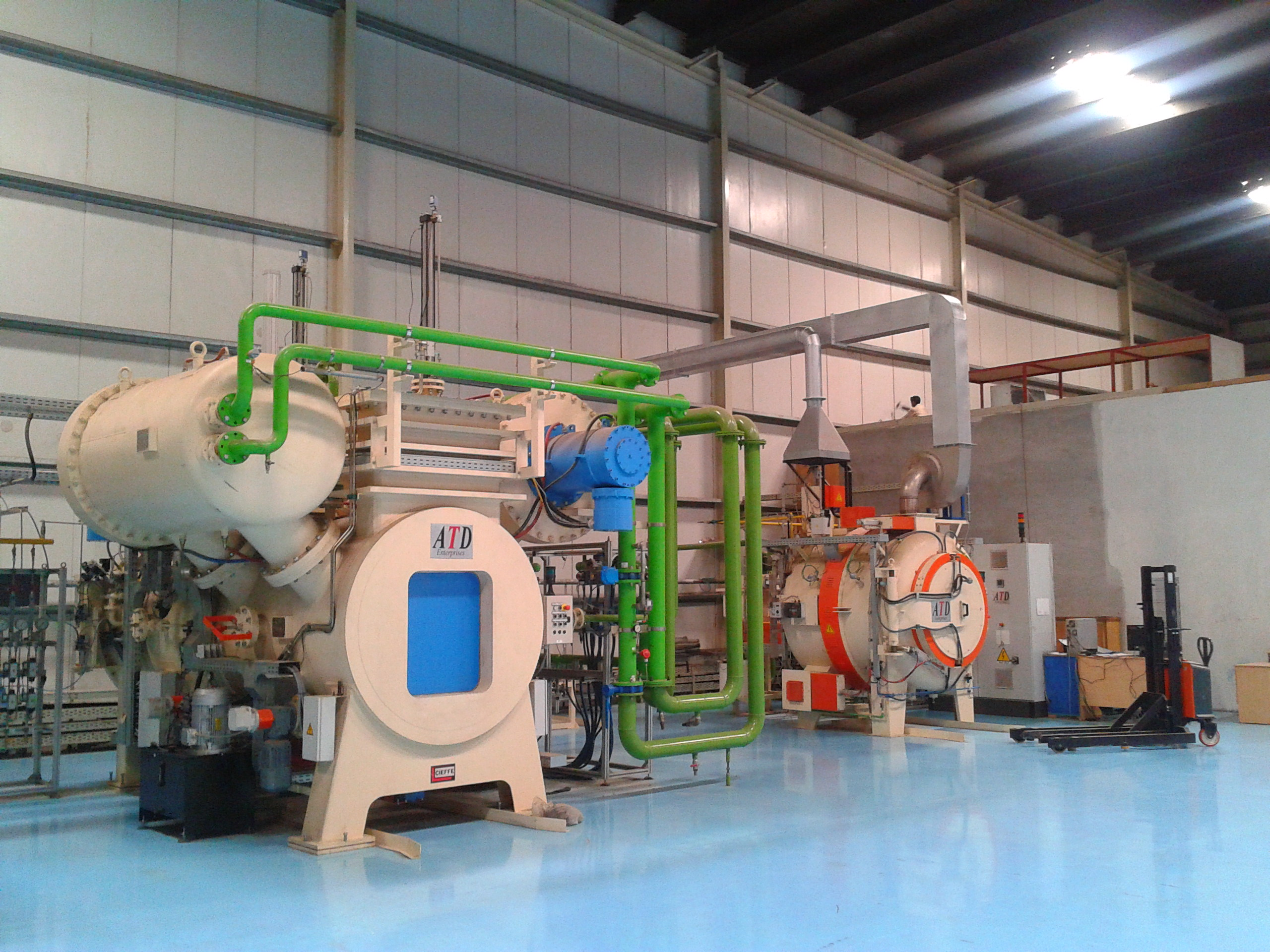
A modern computerised nitriding furnace

Nitriding is a heat treating process that diffuses nitrogen into the surface of a metal to create a case-hardened surface. These processes are most commonly used on low-alloy steels. They are also used on titanium, aluminium and molybdenum.

Typical applications include gears, crankshafts, camshafts, cam followers, valve parts, extruder screws, die-casting tools, forging dies, extrusion dies, firearm components, injectors and plastic mold tools.

== Processes ==
The processes are named after the medium used to donate. The three main methods used are: gas nitriding, salt bath nitriding, and plasma nitriding.

=== Gas nitriding ===
In gas nitriding the donor is a nitrogen-rich gas, usually ammonia (NH_{3}), which is why it is sometimes known as ammonia nitriding. When ammonia comes into contact with the heated work piece it dissociates into nitrogen and hydrogen. The nitrogen then diffuses onto the surface of the material creating a nitride layer. This process has existed for nearly a century, though only in the last few decades has there been a concentrated effort to investigate the thermodynamics and kinetics involved. Recent developments have led to a process that can be accurately controlled. The thickness and phase constitution of the resulting nitriding layers can be selected and the process optimized for the particular properties required.

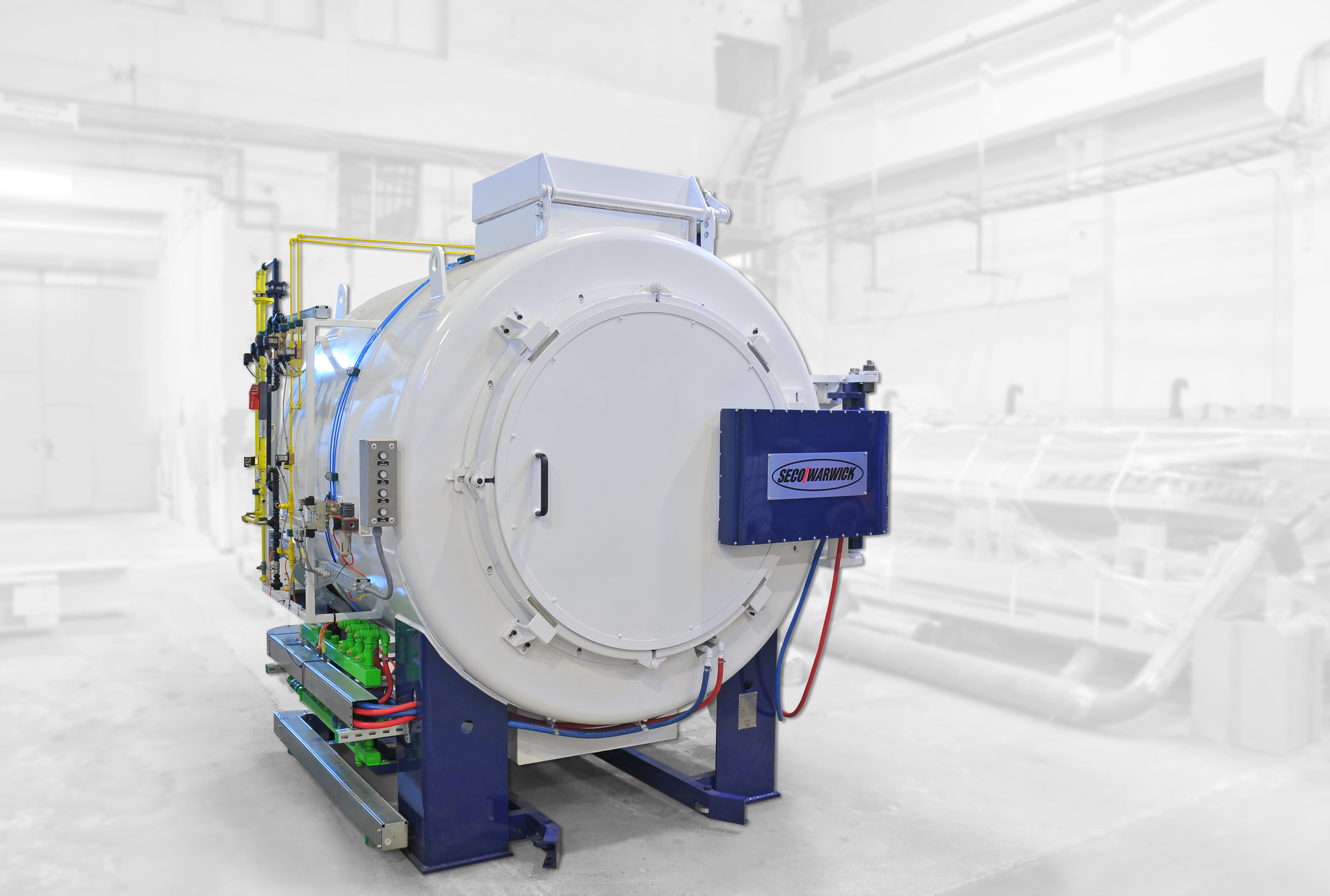
Retort furnaces for nitriding, tempering and annealing by the ZeroFlow method

Additional improvement of the durability of a nitrided surface is possible using the ZeroFlow method. Developed by SECO/Warwick and Poznan University of Technology, the method also allows several-fold reductions in process gas consumption, thereby lowering nitriding costs, and reduces emissions of post-process gases to the environment.

The advantages of gas nitriding over other variants are:

- Precise control of chemical potential of nitrogen in the nitriding atmosphere by controlling gas flow rate of nitrogen and oxygen
- All round nitriding effect (can be a disadvantage in some cases, compared with plasma nitriding)
- Large batch sizes possible – the limiting factor being furnace size and gas flow
- With modern computer control of the atmosphere the nitriding results can be closely controlled
- Relatively low equipment cost – especially compared with plasma

The disadvantages of gas nitriding are:

- Reaction kinetics heavily influenced by surface condition – an oily surface or one contaminated with cutting fluids will deliver poor results
- Surface activation is sometimes required to treat steels with a high chromium content – compare sputtering during plasma nitriding
- Ammonia as nitriding medium – though not especially toxic, it is harmful when inhaled at a high concentration. Also, care must be taken when heating in the presence of oxygen to reduce the risk of explosion.

=== Salt bath nitriding ===
In salt bath nitriding, the nitrogen donating medium is a nitrogen-containing salt such as cyanide salt. The salts used also donate carbon to the workpiece surface, making salt bath a nitrocarburizing process. The temperature used is typical of all nitrocarburizing processes: 550 to 570 °C. Since the salts used are extremely toxic, modern environmental and safety regulation have caused this process to fall out of favor.

The advantages of salt nitriding are:

- Quick processing time – Usually in the order of 4 hours or so to achieve desired diffusion, where other methods take longer.
- Simple operation – The salt bath and workpieces are heated to the desired temperature, and the workpieces are submerged for a given period of time.

The disadvantages are:

- The salts used are highly toxic – Disposal is controlled by stringent environmental laws in western countries.
- Cost – These regulations have increased the costs involved in using salt baths.
- Only one process possible with a particular salt type – since the nitrogen potential is set by the salt, only one type of process is possible.

=== Plasma nitriding ===
Plasma nitriding, also known as ion nitriding, plasma ion nitriding or glow-discharge nitriding, is an industrial surface hardening treatment for metallic materials.

In plasma nitriding, the reactivity of the nitriding media is not due to the temperature, but to the gas ionized state. In this technique, intense electric fields are used to generate ionized molecules of the gas around the surface to be nitrided. Such highly active gas with ionized molecules is called plasma, naming the technique. The gas used for plasma nitriding is usually pure nitrogen, since no spontaneous decomposition is needed (as is the case of nitriding with ammonia). There are hot plasmas typified by plasma jets used for metal cutting, welding, cladding or spraying. There are also cold plasmas, usually generated inside vacuum chambers, at low pressure regimes.

Usually, steels are beneficially treated with plasma nitriding. This process permits the close control of the nitrided microstructure, allowing nitriding with or without compound layer formation. Not only is the performance of metal parts enhanced, but working lifespans also increase, and so do the strain limit and the fatigue strength of the metals being treated. For instance, mechanical properties of austenitic stainless steel like resistance to wear can be significantly augmented and the surface hardness of tool steels can be doubled.

A plasma nitrided part is usually ready for use. It calls for no machining, or polishing or any other post-nitriding operations. Thus the process is user-friendly, saves energy since it works fastest, and causes little or no distortion.

This process was invented by Bernhardt Berghaus of Germany who later settled in Zurich to escape Nazi persecution. After his death in late 1960s, the process was acquired by Klockner group and popularized globally.

Plasma nitriding is often coupled with a physical vapor deposition (PVD) process and labeled duplex treatment, with enhanced benefits. Many users prefer to have a plasma oxidation step combined at the last phase of processing to produce a smooth jetblack layer of oxides which is resistant to wear and corrosion.

Though gas and salt bath nitriding make nitrogen ions available differently at varying temperatures, plasma nitriding efficiency does not depend on the temperature. Plasma nitriding can thus be performed in a broad temperature range, from 260 °C to more than 600 °C. For instance, at moderate temperatures (like 420 °C), stainless steels can be nitrided without the formation of chromium nitride precipitates and hence maintaining their corrosion resistance properties.

In the plasma nitriding processes, nitrogen gas (N_{2}) is usually the nitrogen carrying gas. Other gasses like hydrogen or argon are also used. Indeed, argon and hydrogen can be used before the nitriding process during the heating of the parts to clean the surfaces to be nitrided. This cleaning procedure effectively removes the oxide layer from surfaces and may remove fine layers of solvents that could remain. This also helps the thermal stability of the plasma plant, since the heat added by the plasma is already present during the warm up and hence once the process temperature is reached the actual nitriding begins with minor heating changes. For the nitriding process, hydrogen gas is also added to keep the surface clear of oxides. This effect can be observed by analysing the surface of the part under nitriding (see for instance).

== Materials for nitriding ==
Examples of easily nitridable steels include the SAE 4100, 4300, 5100, 6100, 8600, 8700, 9300 and 9800 series, UK aircraft quality steel grades BS 4S 106, BS 3S 132, 905M39 (EN41B), stainless steels, some tool steels (H13 and P20 for example) and certain cast irons. Ideally, steels for nitriding should be in the hardened and tempered condition, requiring nitriding to take place at a lower temperature than the last tempering temperature. A fine-turned or ground surface finish is best. Minimal amounts of material should be removed post nitriding to preserve the surface hardness.

Nitriding alloys are alloy steels with nitride-forming elements such as aluminum, chromium, molybdenum and titanium.

In 2015, nitriding was used to generate a unique duplex microstructure in an iron-manganese alloy (martensite-austenite, austenite-ferrite), known to be associated with strongly enhanced mechanical properties.

== History ==
Systematic investigation into the effect of nitrogen on the surface properties of steel began in the 1920s. Investigation into gas nitriding began independently in both Germany and America. The process was greeted with enthusiasm in Germany and several steel grades were developed with nitriding in mind: the so-called nitriding steels. The reception in America was less impressive. With so little demand the process was largely forgotten in the US. After WWII the process was reintroduced from Europe. Much research has taken place in recent decades to understand the thermodynamics and kinetics of the reactions involved.

== See also ==
- Boriding
- Carburization
- Carbonitriding
- Ferritic nitrocarburizing
- Surface finishing
