= Quench polish quench =

Process for hardening steel

Quench polish quench (QPQ) is a specialized type of nitrocarburizing case hardening that increases corrosion resistance. It is sometimes known by the brand name of Tufftride, Tenifer or Melonite. Three steps are involved: nitrocarburize ("quench"), polish, and post-oxidize ("quench").

This process is often used when two or more of the following properties are required in a workpiece:

- wear resistance
- corrosion resistance
- fatigue strength

Common applications of the process are for piston rods of shock absorbers, cylinders and rods for hydraulic systems, pumps, axles, spindles, firearm slides and barrels and valves.

== Process ==
The process starts with a standard salt bath nitrocarburizing cycle, which produces a layer of ε iron nitride. Next, the workpiece is mechanically polished; typical polishing processes include vibratory finishing, lapping, and centerless grinding. Finally, the workpiece is re-immersed into the salt quench bath for 20 to 30 minutes, rinsed, and oil dipped. This last step optimizes the corrosion resistance by creating a layer of iron oxide about 3 to 4 micrometers thick. It also gives the workpiece a black finish.

== Corrosion resistance ==
=== Field immersion ===
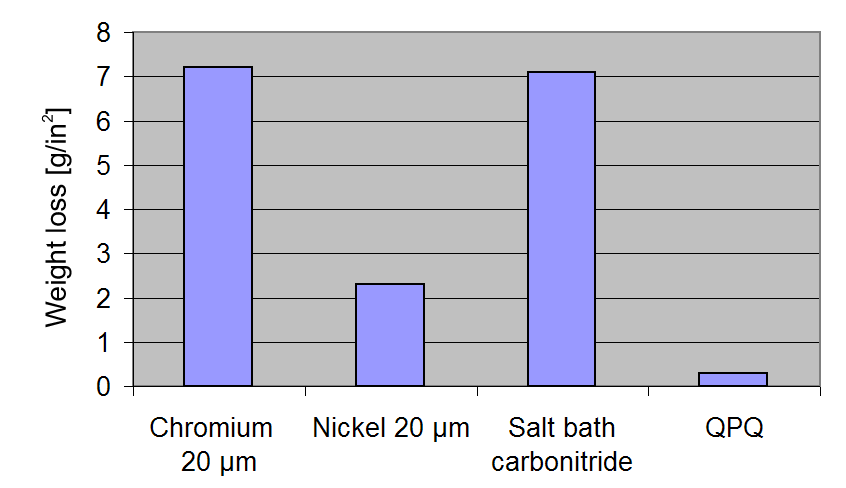
Field immersion comparison chart

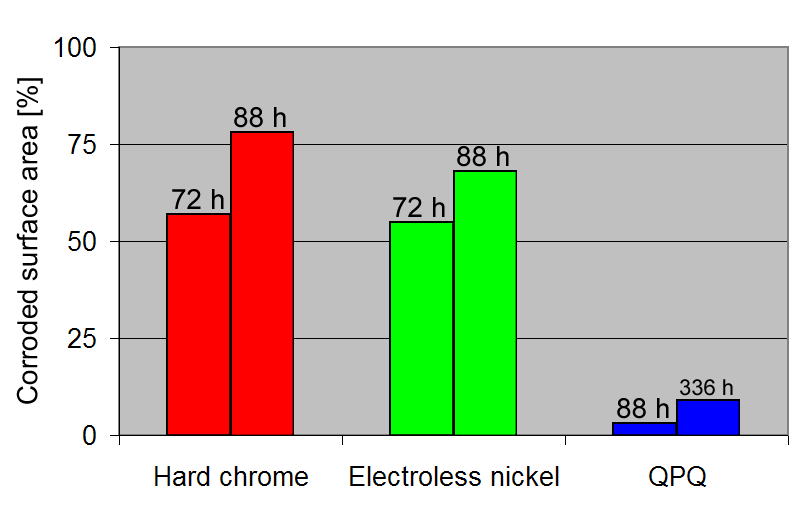
ASTM B117 Salt Spray Test

The chart on the right shows a comparison of corrosion resistance against other surface treatments, based on field immersion tests. Test conditions for the immersion test are full immersion in 3% sodium chloride plus 3 g /L of hydrogen peroxide for 24 hours.

=== Salt spray test ===
The chart on the right shows a comparison of the corrosion resistance of surface treated steel automotive steering columns based on the ASTM B117 salt spray test.

== See also ==
- Hot-dip galvanization
- Jewelling
- Phosphate conversion coating
- Pickling (metal)
