= Carburizing =

Metal heat treatment process

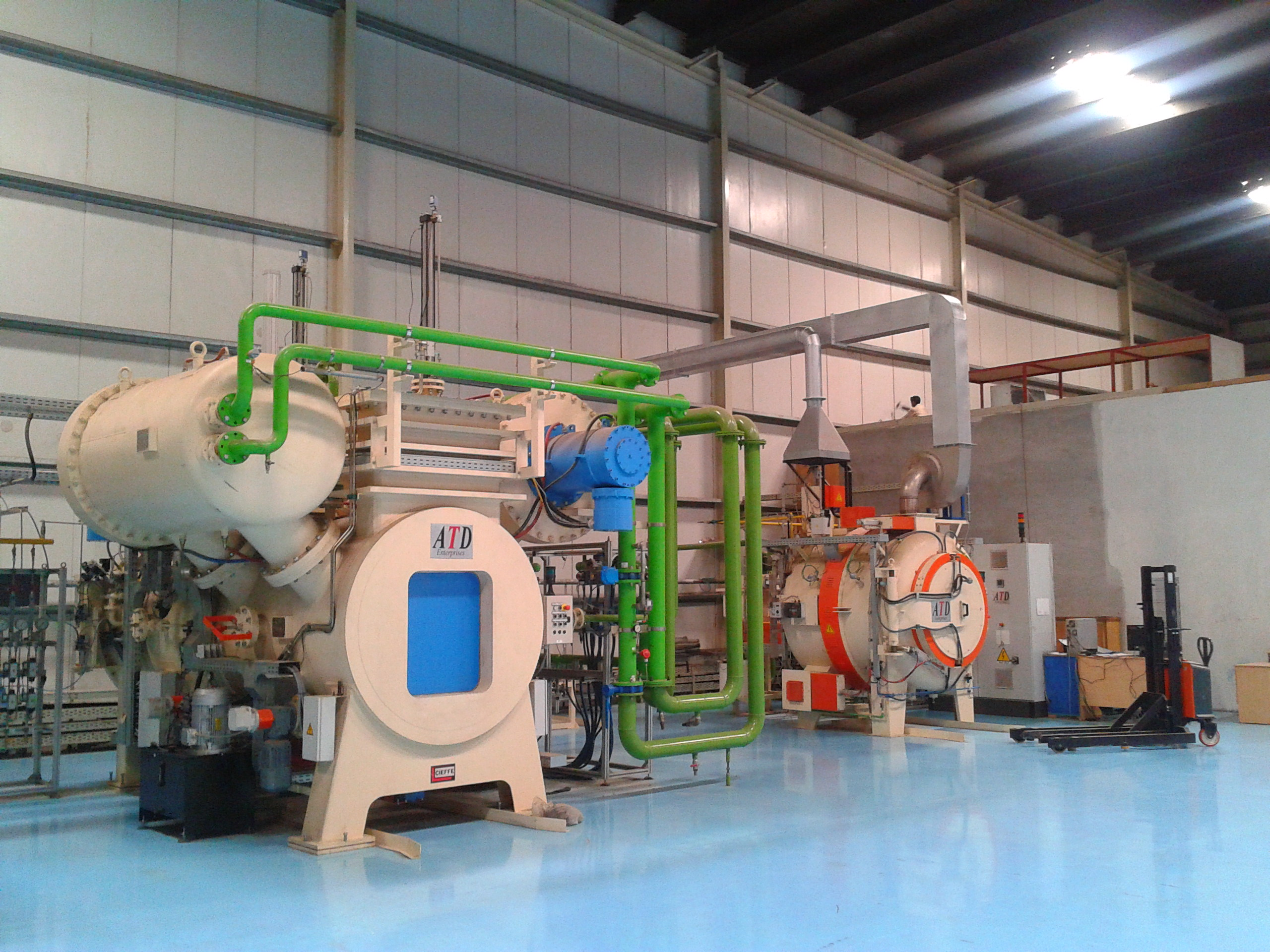
A modern computerised gas carburising furnace

Carburizing, or carburising, is a heat treatment process in which iron or steel absorbs carbon while the metal is heated in the presence of a carbon-bearing material, such as charcoal or carbon monoxide. The intent is to make the metal harder and more wear resistant. Depending on the amount of time and temperature, the affected area can vary in carbon content. Longer carburizing times and higher temperatures typically increase the depth of carbon diffusion. When the iron or steel is cooled rapidly by quenching, the higher carbon content on the outer surface becomes hard due to the transformation from austenite to martensite, while the core remains soft and tough as a ferritic and/or pearlite microstructure.

This manufacturing process can be characterized by the following key points: It is applied to low-carbon workpieces; workpieces are in contact with a high-carbon gas, liquid or solid; it produces a hard workpiece surface; workpiece cores largely retain their toughness and ductility; and it produces case hardness depths of up to 0.25 inches (6.4 mm). In some cases it serves as a remedy for undesired decarburization that happened earlier in a manufacturing process.

== Method ==
Carburization of steel involves a heat treatment of the metallic surface using a source of carbon. Carburization can be used to increase the surface hardness of low-carbon steel.

Early carburization used a direct application of charcoal packed around the sample to be treated (initially referred to as case hardening), but modern techniques use carbon-bearing gases or plasmas (such as carbon dioxide or methane). The process depends primarily upon ambient gas composition and furnace temperature, which must be carefully controlled, as the heat may also impact the microstructure of the remainder of the material. For applications where great control over gas composition is desired, carburization may take place under very low pressures in a vacuum chamber.

Plasma carburization is increasingly used to improve the surface characteristics (such as wear, corrosion resistance, hardness, load-bearing capacity, in addition to quality-based variables) of various metals, notably stainless steels. The process is environmentally friendly (in comparison to gaseous or solid carburizing). It also provides an even treatment of components with complex geometry (the plasma can penetrate into holes and tight gaps), making it very flexible in terms of component treatment.

The process of carburization works via the diffusion of carbon atoms into the surface layers of a metal. As metals are made up of atoms bound tightly into a metallic crystalline lattice, the carbon atoms diffuse into the crystal structure of the metal and either remain in solution (dissolved within the metal crystalline matrix — this normally occurs at lower temperatures) or react with elements in the host metal to form carbides (normally at higher temperatures, due to the higher mobility of the host metal's atoms). If the carbon remains in solid solution, the steel is then heat treated to harden it. Both of these mechanisms strengthen the surface of the metal, the former by forming pearlite or martensite, and the latter via the formation of carbides. Both of these materials are hard and resist abrasion.

Gas carburizing is normally carried out at a temperature within the range of 900 to 950 °C.

In oxy-acetylene welding, a carburizing flame is one with little oxygen, which produces a sooty, lower-temperature flame. It is often used to anneal metal, making it more malleable and flexible during the welding process.

A main goal when producing carburized workpieces is to ensure maximum contact between the workpiece surface and the carbon-rich elements. In gas and liquid carburizing, the workpieces are often supported in mesh baskets or suspended by wire. In pack carburizing, the workpiece and carbon are enclosed in a container to ensure that contact is maintained over as much surface area as possible. Pack carburizing containers are usually made of carbon steel coated with aluminum or heat-resisting nickel-chromium alloy and sealed at all openings with fire clay.

Carburizing can be achieved in either a Conventional Furnace (Atmosphere Furnace) or a Low Pressure Carburizing Furnace (LPC).

- Conventional Furnace (Atmosphere Furnace): conventional carburizing is an atmosphere controlled process with control of the carbon potential.
- Low Pressure Carburizing Furnace (LPC): low pressure carburizing is running without any oxygen and with injections of carburizing gas (ex. acetylene).

== Hardening agents ==
There are different types of elements or materials that can be used to perform this process, but these mainly consist of high carbon content material. A few typical hardening agents include carbon monoxide gas (CO), sodium cyanide and barium carbonate, or hardwood charcoal. In gas carburizing, carbon is given off by propane or natural gas. In liquid carburizing, the carbon is derived from a molten salt composed mainly of sodium cyanide (NaCN) and barium chloride (BaCl_{2}). In pack carburizing, carbon monoxide is given off by coke or hardwood charcoal.

== Geometrical possibilities ==
There are all sorts of workpieces that can be carburized, which means almost limitless possibilities for the shape of materials that can be carburized. However careful consideration should be given to materials that contain nonuniform or non-symmetric sections. Different cross sections may have different cooling rates which can cause excessive stresses in the material and result in breakage.

== Dimensional changes ==
It is virtually impossible to have a workpiece undergo carburization without having some dimensional changes. The amount of these changes varies based on the type of material that is used, the carburizing process that the material undergoes and the original size and shape of the work piece. However changes are small compared to heat-treating operations.

Change in material properties
Work material properties	Effects of carburizing
Mechanical	Increased surface hardness; Increased wear resistance; Increased fatigue/tensile strengths
Physical	Grain growth may occur; Change in volume may occur
Chemical	Increased surface carbon content

== Workpiece material ==
Typically the materials that are carbonized are low-carbon and alloy steels with initial carbon content ranging from 0.2 to 0.3%. The workpiece surface must be free from contaminants, such as oil, oxides, or alkaline solutions, which prevent or impede the diffusion of carbon into the workpiece surface.

== Comparing different methods ==
In general, pack carburizing equipment can accommodate larger workpieces than liquid or gas carburizing equipment, but liquid or gas carburizing methods are faster and lend themselves to mechanized material handling. Also the advantages of carburizing over carbonitriding are greater case depth (case depths of greater than 0.3 inch are possible), less distortion, and better impact strength. This makes it perfect for high strength and wear applications (e.g. scissors or swords). The disadvantages include added expense, higher working temperatures, and increased time.

== Choice of equipment ==
In general, gas carburizing is used for parts that are large. Liquid carburizing is used for small and medium parts and pack carburizing can be used for large parts and individual processing of small parts in bulk. Vacuum carburizing (low pressure carburizing or LPC) can be applied across a large spectrum of parts when used in conjunction with either oil or high pressure gas quenching (HPGQ), depending on the alloying elements within the base material.

== See also ==
- Carbonitriding
- Case-hardening
- Cementation process
- Crucible steel
- Harvey armor (also known as Harveyized steel), an early application of carburizing
- Hayward A. Harvey, a pioneer in the development of carburizing
- Krupp armor
- Nitridization
