= 91st Support Brigade (Ukraine) =

- 91-та окрема бригада підтримки
- Founded: 1992
- Country: Ukraine
- Branch: Ukrainian Ground Forces
- Type: Brigade
- Role: Support Forces
- Part of: Operational Command North
- Garrison/HQ: Okhtyrka
- Engagements: United Nations peacekeeping; UNMIA III; UNIFIL; UNSIM; UNAMI; UNAMIL; Russo-Ukrainian War; War in Donbass; Russian invasion of Ukraine
- Decorations: For Courage and Bravery

Commanders
- Current commander: Colonel Denys Leonidovych Dykyi

The 91st "Okhtyrka" Support Brigade (MUN A0563) is a brigade level unit of the Ukrainian Ground Forces providing engineering, logistical and support services. It was established as a regiment, but was expanded to a brigade in January 2025 and has seen extensive action during the War in Donbass and the Russian invasion of Ukraine, as well as several peacekeeping operations. It is headquartered at Okhtyrka.

== History ==
It was established as the 91st Engineer and Sapper Brigade on 1 December 1974. In 1978, it participated in the "Shagan-78" exercises and then in "Zapad-81" in 1981, later in 1983, the Amur-83 exercises and in 1986, the "Dozor-86" exercises. It also took part in the Soviet-Afghan war from 1979 to 1989. The brigade took part in neutralizing the Chernobyl disaster in 1986, 68 servicemen were involved. One of its personnel, Mykola Aleksandrovich Kalachev, served 45 days in the exclusion zone in Korogod, received 59.98 roentgens of radiation and contracted radiation sickness.

In 1992, it became part of the Ukrainian Armed Forces and took part in many disaster relief operations, notably the management of accidents at ammunition depots in Artemivsk, Novobohdanivka and Lozova, construction of low-water bridges and strengthening of dams, bridges and roads, clearance of roads in Okhtyrka Raion and neighboring areas, disaster management during a freight train accident near Trostyanets in 2012 and supervisory works in Ivanivka. In 1997–1998, its contingent operated as the 901st separate pontoon-bridge unit of the United Nations peacekeeping mission in Angola. Moreover, its detachments also took part in other peace keeping operations such as UNIFIL, UNSIM, UNAMI and UNAMIL.

In 2014, it was mobilized following the Russian invasion of Crimea and got engaged in engineering work in the Kharkiv, Donetsk, and Luhansk Oblast since March 2014, and on 26 March 2014, its forces were deployed to the border with Russia in Luhansk Oblast. Throughout the Wad in Donbass, it performed operations in multiple battles including Sloviansk, Savur-Mohyla, Vodiane, Illovaysk, Luhansk Airport, Donetsk Airport, Volnovakha, Starognativka, Granitne, Grodivka, Krasnohorivka, Shyrokyne, Vuglehirsk, Debaltseve, Pisky, Kurakhove. On 14 July 2014, an officer of the Regiment (Salipa Serhiy Dmytrovych) was killed near Dmytrivka as a result of landmine explosion. On 9 August 2014, a soldier of the Regiment (Bilan Ruslan Mykolayovych) was killed by Russian tank fire near Stepanivka. During the Battle of Ilovaisk, the 91st Engineer Regiment in coordination with 51st Mechanized Brigade fortified positions near Agronomichne. On 26 August 2014, the Regiment was able to capture a Russian T-72B3 tank of the 6th Tank Brigade, near one such position. On 29 August 2014, a soldier of the Regiment (Yuriy Oleksandrovych Berezhny) was killed while trying to escape the encirclement at Ilovaisk. In November 2014, the regiment was assigned the task of fortifying positions near Kurakhove. On 24 November 2014, a soldier of the regiment (Nikolenko Pavlo Viktorovych) was killed near Debaltseve as a result of a BM-21 Grad strike. In December 2024, its personnel were engaged in combat at the Donetsk Oblast with at least three being wounded. As of November 2015, more than 650 soldiers of the regiment had partook in the War in Donbass.

In early June 2019, a contingent of the 91st Separate Operational Support Regiment departed for a peacekeeping mission to the Republic of Kosovo, as part of the Kosovo Force. On 15 November 2019, two soldiers of the Regiment (Yarmak Denys Mykolayovych and Movchan Dmytro Serhiyovych) were killed in Balakliya by an accidental detonation during the disposal of ammunition remnants. On 23 August 2021, the regiment was awarded the honorary name "Okhtyrsky" and on 14 October 2021, it was presented with a battle flag. On 27 August 2021, the head of the Synodal Administration of the Military Clergy of the Orthodox Church of Ukraine, Metropolitan Ioan (Yaremenko) consecrated a chapel for the regiment.

At the beginning of the Russian invasion of Ukraine on 24 February 2022, the regiment engaged in combat during the Battle of Okhtyrka from the first day of invasion, its commander Colonel Denys Dyky took up position as the Chief of the Okhtyrka Garrison and was awarded the Hero of Ukraine for his actions during the Battle. To prevent the movement of Russian troops along the Sumy-Poltava highway, its personnel blew up a bridge over the Vorskla River i Klimentovo, moreover, several bridges to Kharkiv Oblast were also destroyed by the regiment's sappers, stopping and halting rapid Russian advances. The regiment's personnel stopped a Russian column consisting of two IFVs, four tanks, Tiger and Typhoon armored vehicles, two command and staff KamAZs and a Ural with ammunition, destroying a truck and damaging a tank,. capturing fifteen Russian paratroopers Typhoon and Tiger after they retreated into a forested area, however, a soldier of the Regiment (? Teroboronivtsy) was captured and later killed by the Russians. On 26 February, Russian forces launched an airstrike on the barracks of the Regiment at 1:55pm which killed more than 70 soldiers and officers. (Note: including Dulskyi Denis Valentinovich, Bilchenko Vadym Anatoliyovych, Bogorodsky Maksym Mykhailovych, Bondar Serhiy Anatolyevich, Bocharov Igor Vitaliyovych, Bochkar Vitaliy Viktorovych, Volkov Vasyl Nikolaevich, Denys Oleksandrovych Golovyanko, Gomaz Artur Anatoliyovych, Ruslan Mykolayovych Gorobets, Greshyl Oleksandr Serhiyovych, Demydenko Volodymyr Serhiyovych, Dubert Oleg Grigorovich, Dmytro Eduardovich De, Dyachenko Yuriy Oleksandrovych, Yegorov Yuri Pavlovich, Zhmurko Yuriy Volodymyrovych, Zhurba Igor Nikolaevich, Zagrunnyy Serhiy Mykhailovych, Ivanenko Oleksandr Mykolayovych, Kovalev Oleksiy Ivanovich, Kozyrka Andriy Vitaliyovych, Kozyrka Oleksandr Vitaliyovych, Kolisnyk Anatoliy Andriyovych, Anna Vitalievna Kolomiets, Komarnitsky Oleksiy Mykolayovych, Kondrashevsky Vitaly Oleksandrovych, Konovalov Maksym Valeriyovych, Kharchenko Bohdan Volodymyrovych, Kotlyar Igor Olegovich, Kotlyarevsky Rodion Yurievich, Kotsupiy Serhiy Vladyslavovich, Kupriev Volodymyr Mykolayovych, Kushta Oleksandr Grigorovich, Ladur Oleksandr Mykhailovych, Leiba Sergey Vasilyevich, Lysenko Eduard Oleksandrovych, Lomakin Vitaly Anatolyevich, Lomakin Oleksandr Anatolyevich, Andriy Vasilyevich Misyats, Peleshenko Pavlo Pavlovych, Popilnyukh Oleksandr Mykolayovych, Rozhko Mykola Anatoliyovych, Serzhantov Gennady Andriyovych, Sichkarenko Vitaliy Mykolayovych, Suk Igor Anatoliyovych, Viktor Ivanovich Tyshchenko, Anatoly Nikolaevich Usov, Cherkashin Oleksandr Oleksiyovych,) The first Vacuum bomb hit four-story barracks building and the second hit the medical department.

Aftermath of the airstrike on the garrison of the 91st Engineering Regiment

As a result of the airstrike, the barracks were almost completely destroyed and a fire broke out. The Dachny residential area and nearby private infrastructure was also damaged. A bomb targeted at the barracks fell on Armiyskaya Street and damaged the heat-conducting network of the Okhtyrskaya thermal power plant and caused a leakage of hot water which further burnt four servicemen. In the next day, the wounded personnel were sent to a hospital in Poltava for treatment. By 28 February, operations were underway at the struck garrison to clear the rubble. On 1 March 2022, a soldier of the Regiment (Maxim Vyacheslavovich Borysenko) was killed in combat in Okhtyrka. On 2 March 2022, a soldier of the Regiment (Tryndin Oleksiy Pavlovich) was killed by Russian shelling of Kryvyi Rih. After the "deoccupation" of Sumy Oblast in April 2022, the regiment's commanders initiated the "SHIELD-Phantom" ISR project establishing 50 surveillance facilities along the border in Sumy Oblast, continuously monitoring the border situation. On 22 June 2022, while performing combat operations near Kuzemin, a soldier of the Regiment (Vitaliy Igorovych Efremenyuk) was blown up by a Russian landmine. On 21 September 2022, a soldier of the Regiment (Karpenko Valeriy Olegovich) was killed by a Russian UAV strike while performing demining tasks in Velyki Prokhody.

On 6 December 2023, the regiment was awarded the honorary award "For Courage and Bravery". A soldier of the Regiment (Matrenchuk Oleksandr Vasyliovych) was killed in action near Dronivka during the Battle of Bakhmut on 15 March 2024. Two more soldiers (Sheiko Leonid Vasilyovych and Mishchanin Maxim Ivanovych) were also killed the same day, on 15 March 2024, by MLRS strikes near Oleksandrivka near Okhtyrka. A soldier of the Regiment (Dubovik Serhiy Nikolaevich) succumbed to his injuries on 20 July 2024. On 15 January 2025, a soldier of the Regiment (Sinyavsky Denis Alexandrovich) was killed in Dnipropetrovsk Oblast. By the end of January 2025, the regiment became the 91st Separate Okhtyrka Support Brigade. A soldier of the Brigade (Fedyuk Ivan Vasilyovych) was killed on 3 February 2025 while performing a combat mission in Shevchenkove.

== Equipment ==
Model	Image	Origin	Type	Number	Details
Support Vehicles
BTR-70		Soviet Union	Command Vehicle	2	
IMR-2		Soviet Union	Heavy Combat engineering vehicle		
Anti-tank weaponry
MT-12 Rapier		Soviet Union	100 mm anti-tank gun		
RPG-18		Soviet Union	Disposable anti-tank rocket launcher		
RPG-22		Soviet Union	Disposable anti-tank rocket launcher		
RPG-26		Soviet Union	Disposable anti-tank rocket launcher		
Stugna		Ukraine	Gun launched ATGM		
FGM-148 Javelin		United States	Man-portable anti-tank system		
MANPADS
9K38 Igla		Soviet Union	Man-portable infrared homing surface-to-air missile		
FIM-92 Stinger		United States	Man-portable infrared homing surface-to-air missile		

== Commanders ==
- Colonel Vdovichen Vasyl Mykolayovych (1992–2002)
- Colonel Yuriy Volodymyrovych Voznytskyi (2002–2009)
- Colonel Yakovets Oleksandr Vasylyovych (2009–2014)
- Roman Kernychny (2014)
- Colonel Yakovets Oleksandr Vasylyovych (2014–2018)
- Colonel Denys Leonidovych Dykyi (2018-)

== Sources ==
- Військові частини Сухопутних військ за родами військ
- Особовий склад 91 інженерного полку проводить навчання на полігоні військової частини // Телеканал Пульсар, 17 березня 2014
