= Dykyi =

Dykyi (Ukrainian: Дикий) is a surname meaning "wild" in Ukrainian. Less common transliterations include Dykyy, Dykyĭ or Dykyj.

Notable people with the surname include:

- Antin Dykyi (1900–1937), Ukrainian writer
- Denys Dykyi (born 1980), Ukrainian military officer
- Hennadii Dykyi (born 1969), Ukrainian politician
- Volodymyr Dykyi (1962–2021), Ukrainian footballer and coach

== See also ==
- Dikiy
