= Ivanivka =

Ivanivka (Ukrainian: Іва́нівка) is one of the most popular placenames in Ukraine. It may refer to:

== Rural settlements ==
- Ivanivka, Luhansk Oblast
- Ivanivka, Odesa Oblast
  - Ivanivka settlement hromada, Odesa Oblast
- Ivanivka, Henichesk Raion, Kherson Oblast

== Villages ==
=== Autonomous Republic of Crimea ===
- Ivanivka, Bilohirsk Raion, Crimea
- Ivanivka, Kerch Raion, Crimea
- Ivanivka, Simferopol Raion, Crimea
- Ivanivka, Yevpatoriya Raion, Crimea

=== Cherkasy Oblast ===
- Ivanivka, Cherkasy Oblast

=== Chernihiv Oblast ===
- Ivanivka, Chernihiv Raion, Chernihiv Oblast
  - Ivanivka rural hromada, Chernihiv Oblast
- Ivanivka, Koriukivka Raion, Chernihiv Oblast
- Ivanivka, Nizhyn Raion, Chernihiv Oblast
- Ivanivka, Novhorod-Siverskyi Raion, Chernihiv Oblast

=== Dnipropetrovsk Oblast ===
- Ivanivka, Chumaky rural hromada, Dnipro Raion, Dnipropetrovsk Oblast
- Ivanivka, Petrykivka settlement hromada, Dnipro Raion, Dnipropetrovsk Oblast
- Ivanivka, Kamianske Raion, Dnipropetrovsk Oblast
- Ivanivka, Rannii Ranok starosta okruh, Lozuvatka rural hromada, Kryvyi Rih Raion, Dnipropetrovsk Oblast
- Ivanivka, Sofiivka starosta okruh, Lozuvatka rural hromada, Kryvyi Rih Raion, Dnipropetrovsk Oblast
- Ivanivka, Nikopol Raion, Dnipropetrovsk Oblast
- Ivanivka, Mezhova settlement hromada, Synelnykove Raion, Dnipropetrovsk Oblast
- Ivanivka, Raivka rural hromada, Synelnykove Raion, Dnipropetrovsk Oblast
- Ivanivka, Vasylkivka settlement hromada, Synelnykove Raion, Dnipropetrovsk Oblast
- Ivanivka, Yavornytske settlement hromada, Synelnykove Raion, Dnipropetrovsk Oblast

=== Donetsk Oblast ===
- Ivanivka, Kalmiuske Raion, Donetsk Oblast
- Ivanivka, Lyman urban hromada, Kramatorsk Raion, Donetsk Oblast
- Ivanivka, Cherkaske settlement hromada, Kramatorsk Raion, Donetsk Oblast
- Ivanivka, Hrodivka settlement hromada, Pokrovsk Raion, Donetsk Oblast
- Ivanivka, Shakhove rural hromada, Pokrovsk Raion, Donetsk Oblast
- Ivanivka, Volnovakha Raion, Donetsk Oblast

=== Ivano-Frankivsk Oblast ===
- Ivanivka, Ivano-Frankivsk Oblast

=== Kharkiv Oblast ===
- Ivanivka, Bohodukhiv Raion, Kharkiv Oblast
- Ivanivka, Havrylivka starosta okruh, Barvinkove urban hromada, Izium Raion, Kharkiv Oblast
- Ivanivka, Ivanivka starosta okruh, Barvinkove urban hromada, Izium Raion, Kharkiv Oblast
- Ivanivka, Izium urban hromada, Izium Raion, Kharkiv Oblast
- Ivanivka, Dvorichna settlement hromada, Kupiansk Raion, Kharkiv Oblast
- Ivanivka, Petropavlivka rural hromada, Kupiansk Raion, Kharkiv Oblast
- Ivanivka, Nyzhnii Burluk starosta okruh, Shevchenkove settlement hromada, Kupiansk Raion, Kharkiv Oblast
- Ivanivka, Petrivka starosta okruh, Shevchenkove settlement hromada, Kupiansk Raion, Kharkiv Oblast

=== Kherson Oblast ===
- Ivanivka, Beryslav Raion, Kherson Oblast
- Ivanivka, Kakhovka Raion, Kherson Oblast
- Ivanivka, Kherson Raion, Kherson Oblast
- Ivanivka, Skadovsk Raion, Kherson Oblast

=== Khmelnytskyi Oblast ===
- Ivanivka, Kamianets-Podilskyi Raion, Khmelnytskyi Oblast
- Ivanivka, Horodok urban hromada, Khmelnytskyi Raion, Khmelnytskyi Oblast
- Ivanivka, Rozsosha rural hromada, Khmelnytskyi Raion, Khmelnytskyi Oblast
- Ivanivka, Volochysk urban hromada, Khmelnytskyi Raion, Khmelnytskyi Oblast
- Ivanivka, Bilohiria settlement hromada, Shepetivka Raion, Khmelnytskyi Oblast
- Ivanivka, Iziaslav urban hromada, Shepetivka Raion, Khmelnytskyi Oblast
- Ivanivka, Ulashanivka rural hromada, Shepetivka Raion, Khmelnytskyi Oblast

=== Kirovohrad Oblast ===
- Ivanivka, Holovanivsk Raion, Kirovohrad Oblast
- Ivanivka, Hurivka rural hromada, Kropyvnytskyi Raion, Kirovohrad Oblast
- Ivanivka, Ketrysanivka rural hromada, Kropyvnytskyi Raion, Kirovohrad Oblast
- Ivanivka, Oleksandrivka settlement hromada, Kropyvnytskyi Raion, Kirovohrad Oblast
- Ivanivka, Sokolivske rural hromada, Kropyvnytskyi Raion, Kirovohrad Oblast
- Ivanivka, Novomyrhorod urban hromada, Novoukrainka Raion, Kirovohrad Oblast
- Ivanivka, Rivne rural hromada, Novoukrainka Raion, Kirovohrad Oblast
- Ivanivka, Oleksandriia urban hromada, Oleksandriia Raion, Kirovohrad Oblast
- Ivanivka, Petrove settlement hromada, Oleksandriia Raion, Kirovohrad Oblast
- Ivanivka, Velyka Andrusivka rural hromada, Oleksandriia Raion, Kirovohrad Oblast

=== Kyiv Oblast ===
- Ivanivka, Stavyshche settlement hromada, Bila Tserkva Raion, Kyiv Oblast
- Ivanivka, Uzyn urban hromada, Bila Tserkva Raion, Kyiv Oblast
- Ivanivka, Kaharlyk urban hromada, Obukhiv Raion, Kyiv Oblast
- Ivanivka, Myronivka urban hromada, Obukhiv Raion, Kyiv Oblast

=== Luhansk Oblast ===
- Ivanivka, Dovzhansk Raion, Luhansk Oblast
- Ivanivka, Svatove Raion, Luhansk Oblast

=== Lviv Oblast ===
- Ivanivka, Lviv Oblast

=== Mykolaiv Oblast ===
- Ivanivka, Kutsurub rural hromada, Mykolaiv Raion, Mykolaiv Oblast
- Ivanivka, Nechaiane rural hromada, Mykolaiv Raion, Mykolaiv Oblast
- Ivanivka, Stepove rural hromada, Mykolaiv Raion, Mykolaiv Oblast
- Ivanivka, Pervomaisk Raion, Mykolaiv Oblast

=== Odesa Oblast ===
- Ivanivka, Berezivka Raion, Odesa Oblast
- Ivanivka, Liubashivka settlement hromada, Podilsk Raion, Odesa Oblast
- Ivanivka, Okny settlement hromada, Podilsk Raion, Odesa Oblast
- Ivanivka, Novoborysivka rural hromada, Rozdilna Raion, Odesa Oblast
- Ivanivka, Zatyshshia settlement hromada, Rozdilna Raion, Odesa Oblast

=== Poltava Oblast ===
- Ivanivka, Kremenchuk Raion, Poltava Oblast
- Ivanivka, Lubny Raion, Poltava Oblast
- Ivanivka, Myrhorod Raion, Poltava Oblast
- Ivanivka, Poltava Raion, Poltava Oblast

=== Rivne Oblast ===
- Ivanivka, Kozyn rural hromada, Dubno Raion, Rivne Oblast
- Ivanivka, Mlyniv settlement hromada, Dubno Raion, Rivne Oblast
- Ivanivka, Sosnove settlement hromada, Rivne Raion, Rivne Oblast
- Ivanivka, Velyki Mezhyrichi rural hromada, Rivne Raion, Rivne Oblast
- Ivanivka, Sarny Raion, Rivne Oblast

=== Sumy Oblast ===
- Ivanivka, Konotop Raion, Sumy Oblast
- Ivanivka, Okhtyrka Raion, Sumy Oblast
- Ivanivka, Romny Raion, Sumy Oblast

=== Ternopil Oblast ===
- Ivanivka, Ivanivka rural hromada, Ternopil Raion, Ternopil Oblast
  - Ivanivka rural hromada, Ternopil Oblast
- Ivanivka, Pidvolochysk settlement hromada, Ternopil Raion, Ternopil Oblast

=== Vinnytsia Oblast ===
- Ivanivka, Haisyn Raion, Vinnytsia Oblast
- Ivanivka, Vinnytsia Raion, Vinnytsia Oblast

=== Volyn Oblast ===
- Ivanivka, Kovel Raion, Volyn Oblast
- Ivanivka, Berestechko urban hromada, Lutsk Raion, Volyn Oblast
- Ivanivka, Rozhyshche urban hromada, Lutsk Raion, Volyn Oblast
- Ivanivka, Volodymyr Raion, Volyn Oblast

== See also ==
- Ivanovka (disambiguation), the equivalent Russian-language name
- Ivanivka Raion (disambiguation)
