= Ivanovsky District =

Location of Amur Oblast in Russia

Location of Ivanovo Oblast in Russia

Ivanovsky District is the name of several administrative and municipal districts in Russia:

- Ivanovsky District, Amur Oblast, an administrative and municipal district of Amur Oblast
- Ivanovsky District, Ivanovo Oblast, an administrative and municipal district of Ivanovo Oblast

== See also ==
- Ivanovsky (disambiguation)
- Ivanovskoye District, a district of Eastern Administrative Okrug of Moscow
- Ivanivka Raion (disambiguation), two raions (districts) in Ukraine
