= Military engineering vehicle =

Battlefield support vehicle

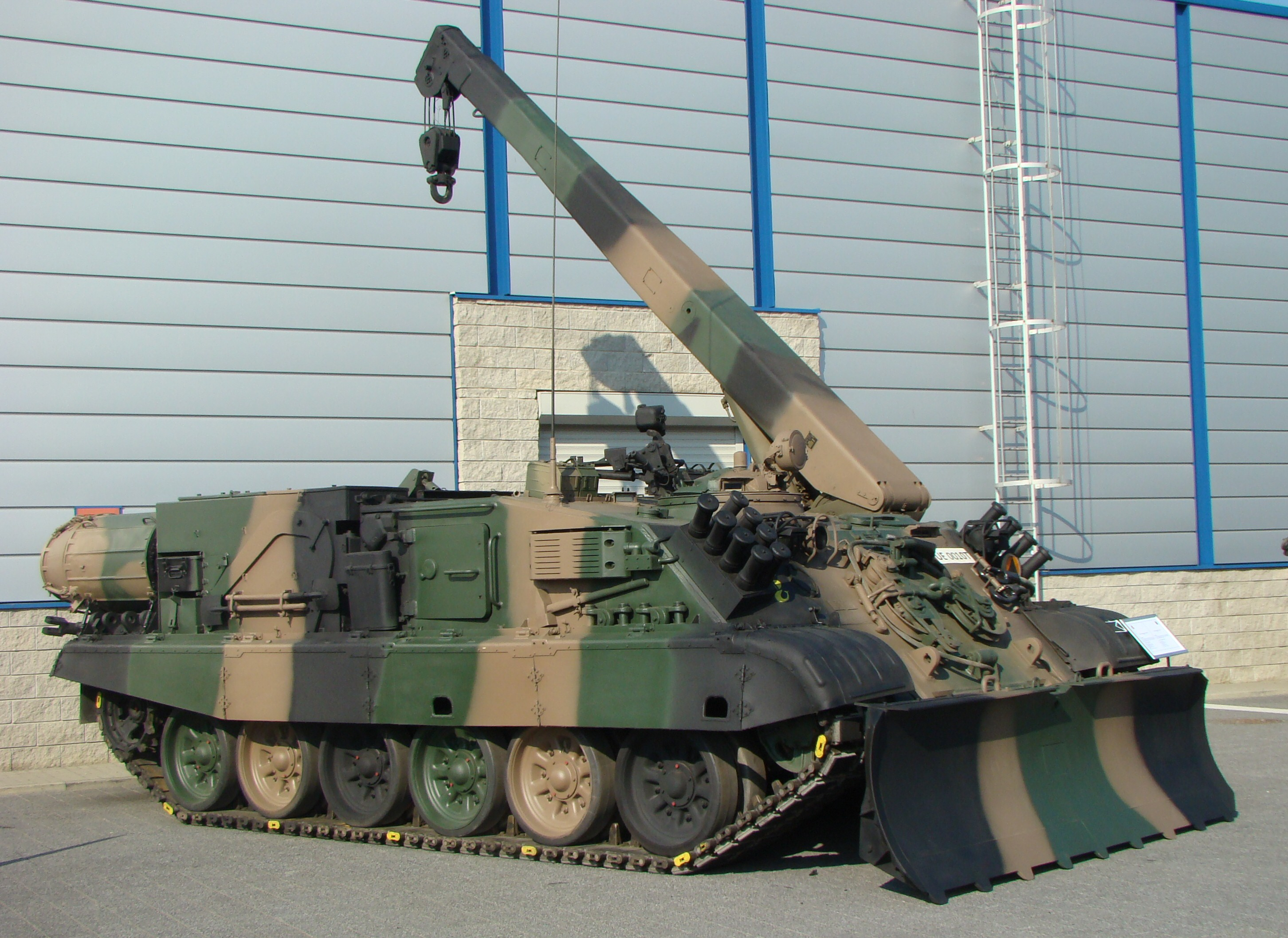
The WZT3 is use by Polish Land Forces.

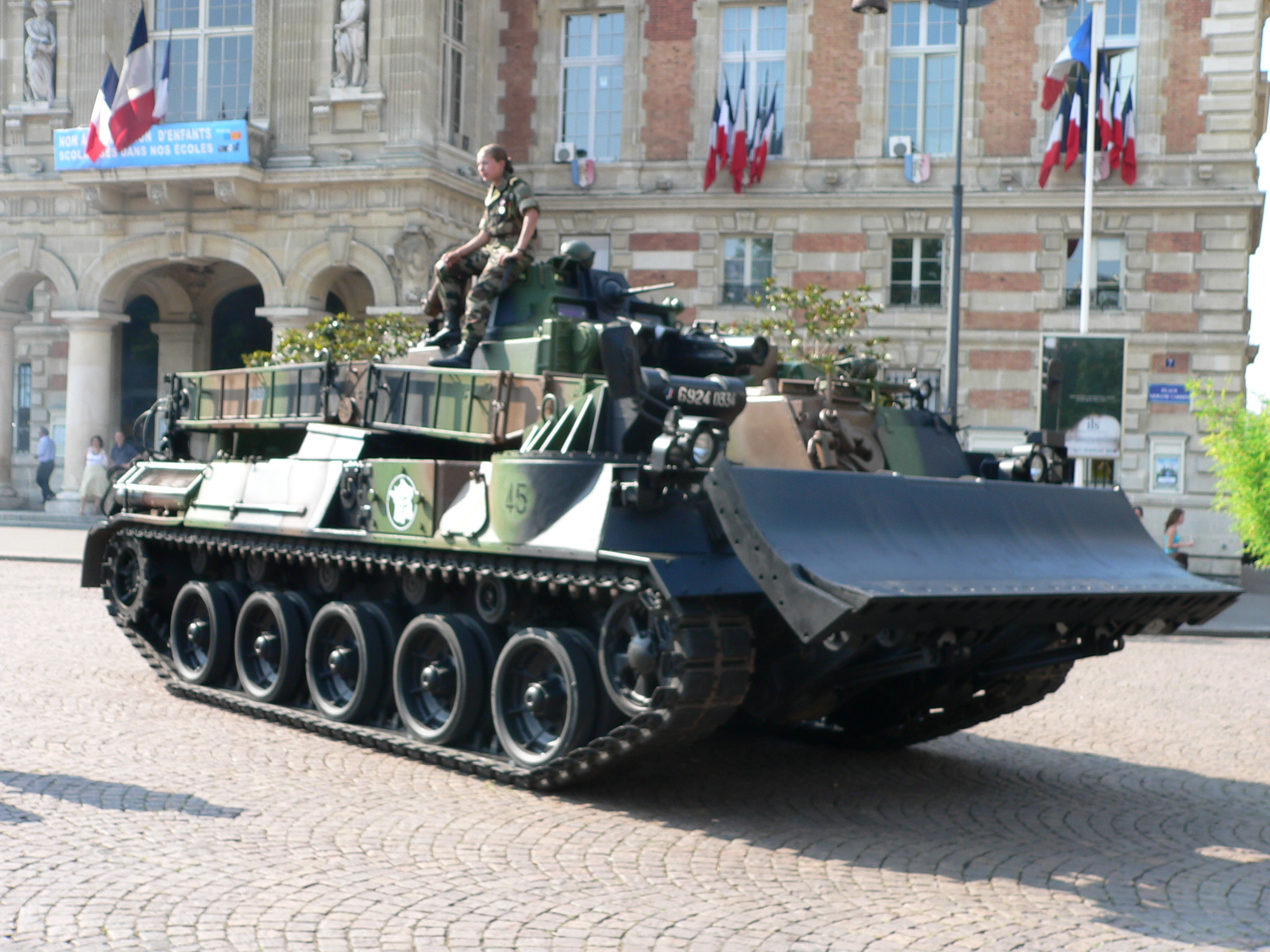
The EBG combat engineering vehicle, based on the AMX 30 tank, is used by the engineers of the French Army.

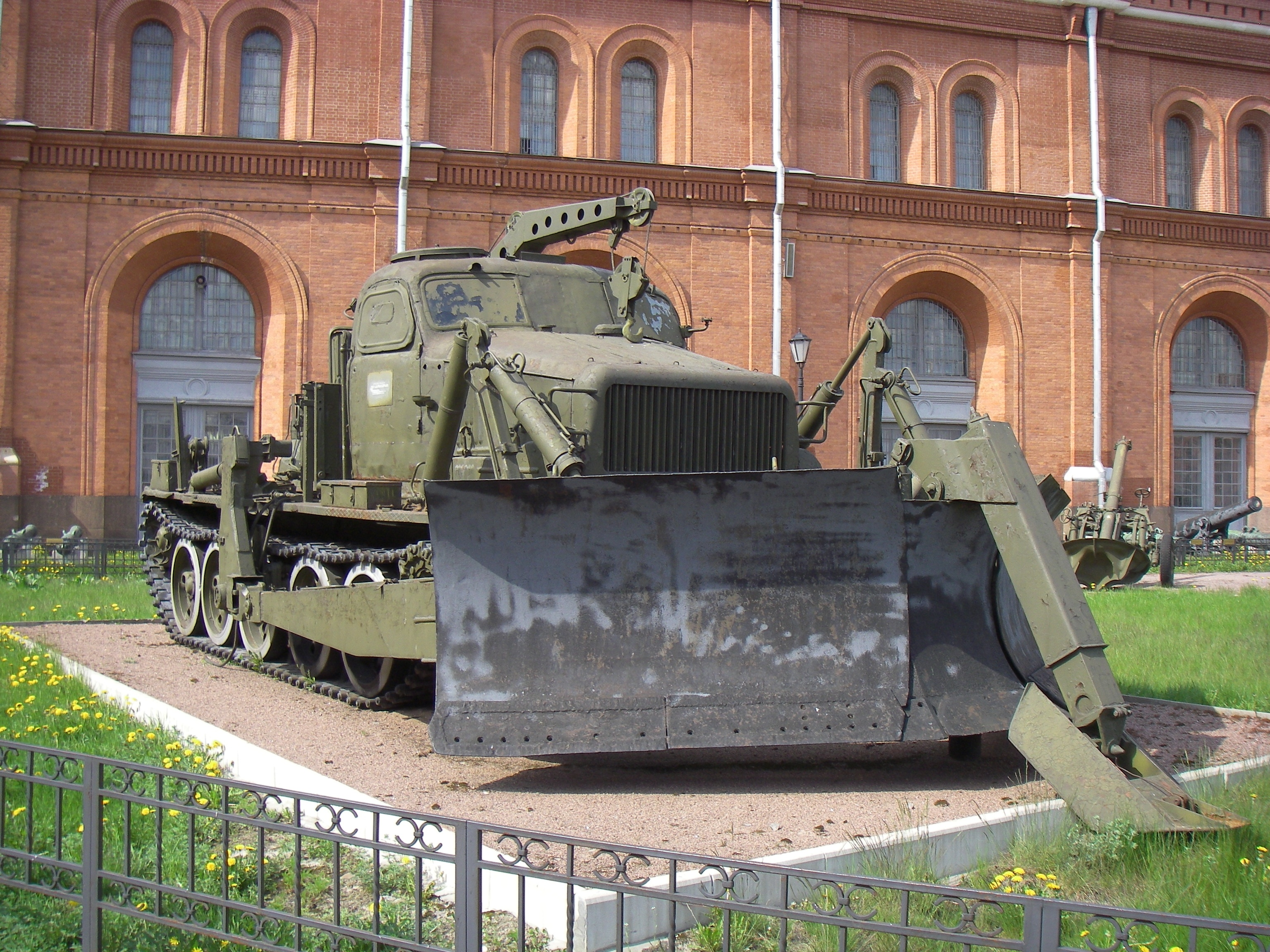
BAT-M engineering vehicle of Russia and the former Soviet Union

A military engineering vehicle is a vehicle built for construction work or for the transportation of combat engineers on the battlefield. These vehicles may be modified civilian equipment (such as the armoured bulldozers that many nations field) or purpose-built military vehicles (such as the AVRE). The first appearance of such vehicles coincided with the appearance of the first tanks, these vehicles were modified Mark V tanks for bridging and mine clearance. Modern military engineering vehicles are expected to fulfill numerous roles such as; bulldozer, crane, grader, excavator, dump truck, breaching vehicle, bridging vehicle, military ferry, amphibious crossing vehicle, and combat engineer section carrier.

== History ==
=== World War I ===
A Heavy RE tank was developed shortly after World War I by Major Giffard LeQuesne Martel RE. This vehicle was a modified Mark V tank. Two support functions for these Engineer Tanks were developed: bridging and mine clearance. The bridging component involved an assault bridge, designed by Major Charles Inglis RE, called the Canal Lock Bridge, which had sufficient length to span a canal lock. Major Martel mated the bridge with the tank and used hydraulic power generated by the tank's engine to maneuver the bridge into place. For mine clearance the tanks were equipped with 2 ton rollers.

=== 1918-1939 ===
Between the wars various experimental bridging tanks were used to test a series of methods for bridging obstacles and developed by the Experimental Bridging Establishment (EBE). Captain SG Galpin RE conceived a prototype Light Tank Mk V to test the Scissors Assault Bridge. This concept was realised by Captain SA Stewart RE with significant input from a Mr DM Delany, a scientific civil servant in the employ of the EBE. MB Wild & Co, Birmingham, also developed a bridge that could span gaps of 26 feet using a complex system of steel wire ropes and a traveling jib, where the front section was projected and then attached to the rear section prior to launching the bridge. This system had to be abandoned due to lack of success in getting it to work, however the idea was later used successfully on the Beaver Bridge Laying Tank.

=== Early World War II ===
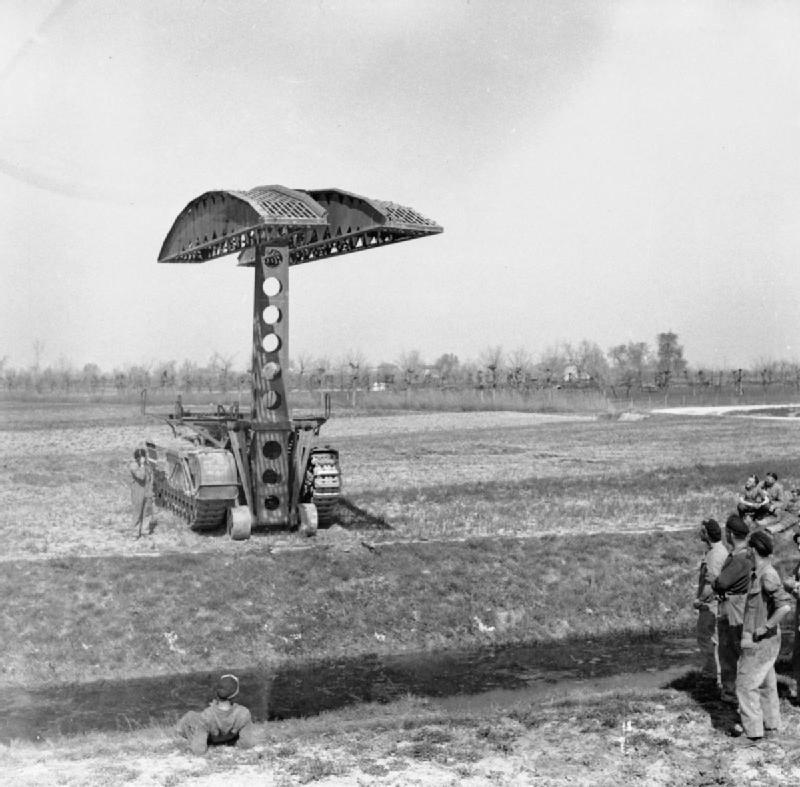
A Churchill bridgelayer of 51st Royal Tank Regiment in action during a demonstration in the Mezzano area, 30 March 1945.

Once World War II had begun, the development of armoured vehicles for use by engineers in the field was accelerated under Delaney's direction. The EBE rapidly developed an assault bridge carried on a modified Covenanter tank capable of deploying a 24-ton tracked load capacity bridge (Class 24) that could span gaps of 30 feet. However, it did not see service in the British armed forces, and all vehicles were passed onto Allied forces such as Australia and Czechoslovakia.

A Class 30 design superseded the Class 24 with no real re-design, simply the substitution of the Covenanter tank with a suitably modified Valentine. As tanks in the war got heavier, a new bridge capable of supporting them was developed. A heavily modified Churchill used a single-piece bridge mounted on a turret-less tank and was able to lay the bridge in 90 seconds; this bridge was able to carry a 60-ton tracked or 40-ton wheeled load.

=== Late World War II: Hobart's 'Funnies' and D-Day ===
Hobart's Funnies were a number of unusually modified tanks operated during the Second World War by the 79th Armoured Division of the British Army or by specialists from the Royal Engineers. They were designed in light of problems that more standard tanks experienced during the amphibious Dieppe Raid, so that the new models would be able to overcome the problems of the planned Invasion of Normandy. These tanks played a major part on the Commonwealth beaches during the landings. They were forerunners of the modern combat engineering vehicle and were named after their commander, Major General Percy Hobart.

Hobart's unusual, specialized tanks, nicknamed "funnies", included:

- AVRE (Assault Vehicle Royal Engineer), used to protect engineers in an assault role, and enable combat engineering.
- ARK (Armoured Ramp Carrier) where the tank itself was the "bridge". Multiple vehicles could be used to span gaps in both the vertical and horizontal. The tank had the turret removed and trackways fitted to the hull. Ramps were attached at each end of the trackways extending the bridging potential and allowing its use in difficult terrain. The tank would need recovery after its use was no longer required.
- Crab: A modified Sherman tank equipped with a mine flail, a rotating cylinder of weighted chains that exploded mines in the path of the tank.
- Armored bulldozer: A conventional Caterpillar D7 bulldozer fitted with armour to protect the driver and the engine. Their job was to clear the invasion beaches of obstacles and to make roads accessible by clearing rubble and filling in bomb craters. Conversions were carried out by Caterpillar importer Jack Olding & Company Ltd of Hatfield.
- Centaur bulldozer: A Centaur tank with the turret removed and fitted with a simple winch-operated bulldozer blade. These were produced because of a need for a well-armoured obstacle-clearing vehicle that, unlike a conventional bulldozer, would be fast enough to keep up with tank formations. They were not used on D-Day but were issued to the 79th Armoured Division in Belgium during the latter part of 1944.

In U.S. Forces, Sherman tanks were also fitted with dozer blades, and anti-mine roller devices were developed, enabling engineering operations and providing similar capabilities.

=== Post war ===
Post war, the value of the combat engineering vehicles had been proven, and armoured multi-role engineering vehicles have been added to the majority of armoured forces.

== Types ==
=== Civilian and militarized heavy equipment ===
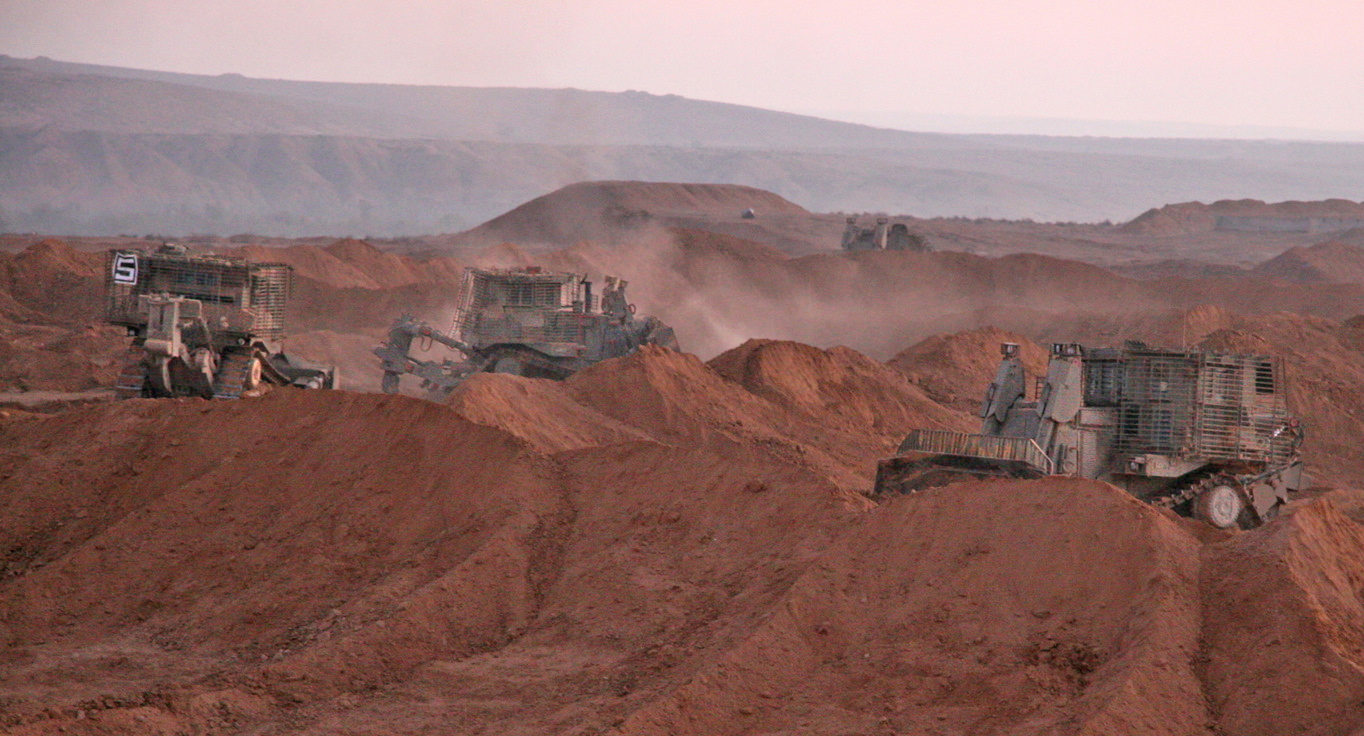
IDF Caterpillar D9R armored bulldozers carry out earthworks. Their heavy armor is developed and manufactured in Israel jointly by the Israel Defense Forces and Israeli defense industries.

Military engineering can employ a wide variety of heavy equipment in the same ways to how this equipment is used outside the military. Bulldozers, cranes, graders, excavators, dump trucks, loaders, and backhoes all see extensive use by military engineers.

Military engineers may also use civilian heavy equipment which was modified for military applications. Typically, this involves adding armour for protection from battlefield hazards such as artillery, unexploded ordnance, mines, and small arms fire. Often this protection is provided by armour plates and steel jackets. Some examples of armoured civilian heavy equipment are the IDF Caterpillar D9, American D7 TPK, Canadian D6 armoured bulldozer, cranes, graders, excavators, and M35 2-1/2 ton cargo truck.

Militarized heavy equipment may also take on the form of traditional civilian equipment designed and built to unique military specifications. These vehicles typically sacrifice some depth of capability from civilian models in order to gain greater speed and independence from prime movers. Examples of this type of vehicle include high speed backhoes such as the Australian Army's High Mobility Engineering Vehicle (HMEV) from Thales or the Canadian Army's Multi-Purpose Engineer Vehicle (MPEV) from Arva.

The main article for civilian heavy equipment is: Heavy equipment (construction)

=== Armoured engineering vehicle ===
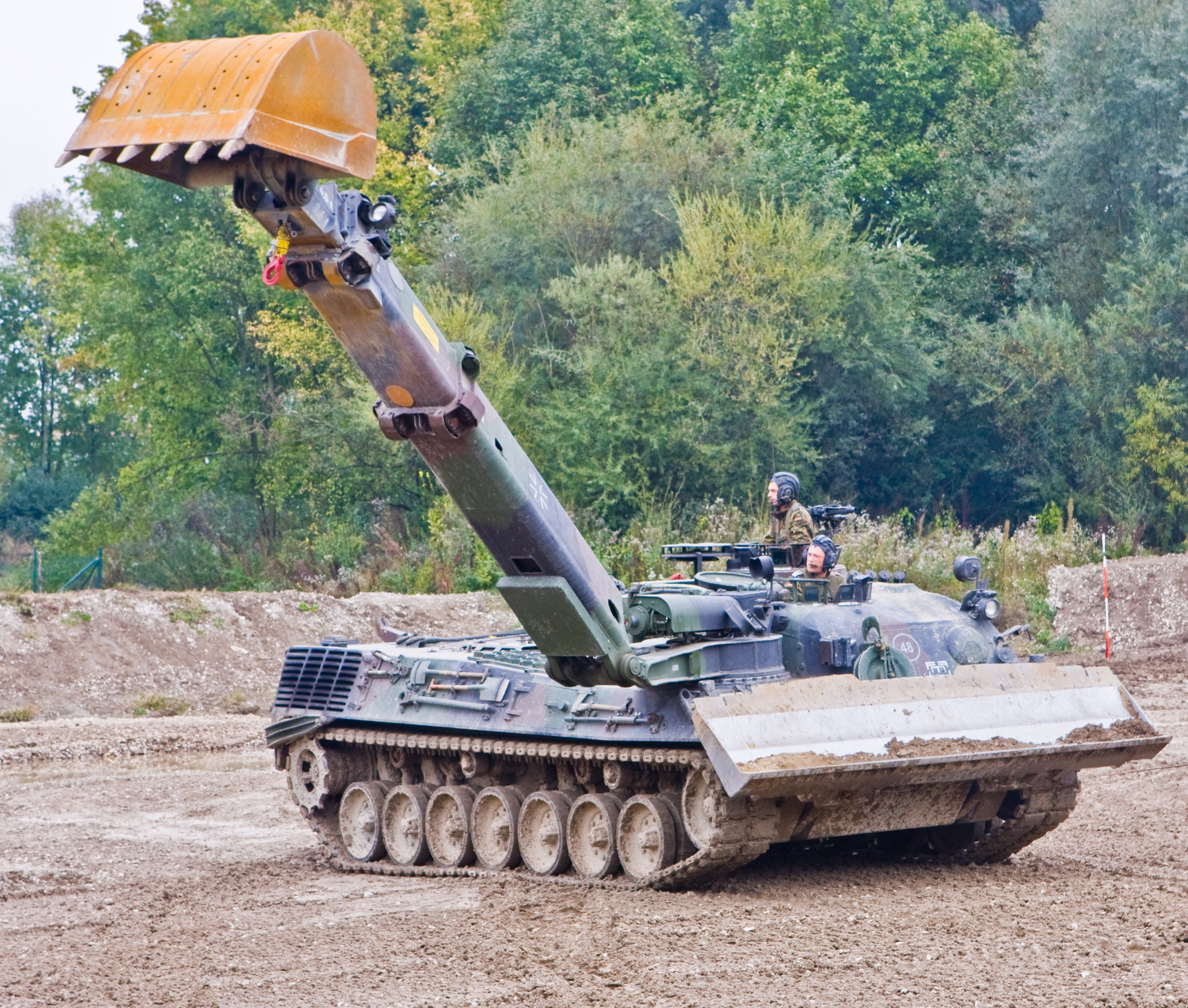
PionierPanzer Dachs AEV of the German Army (2008)

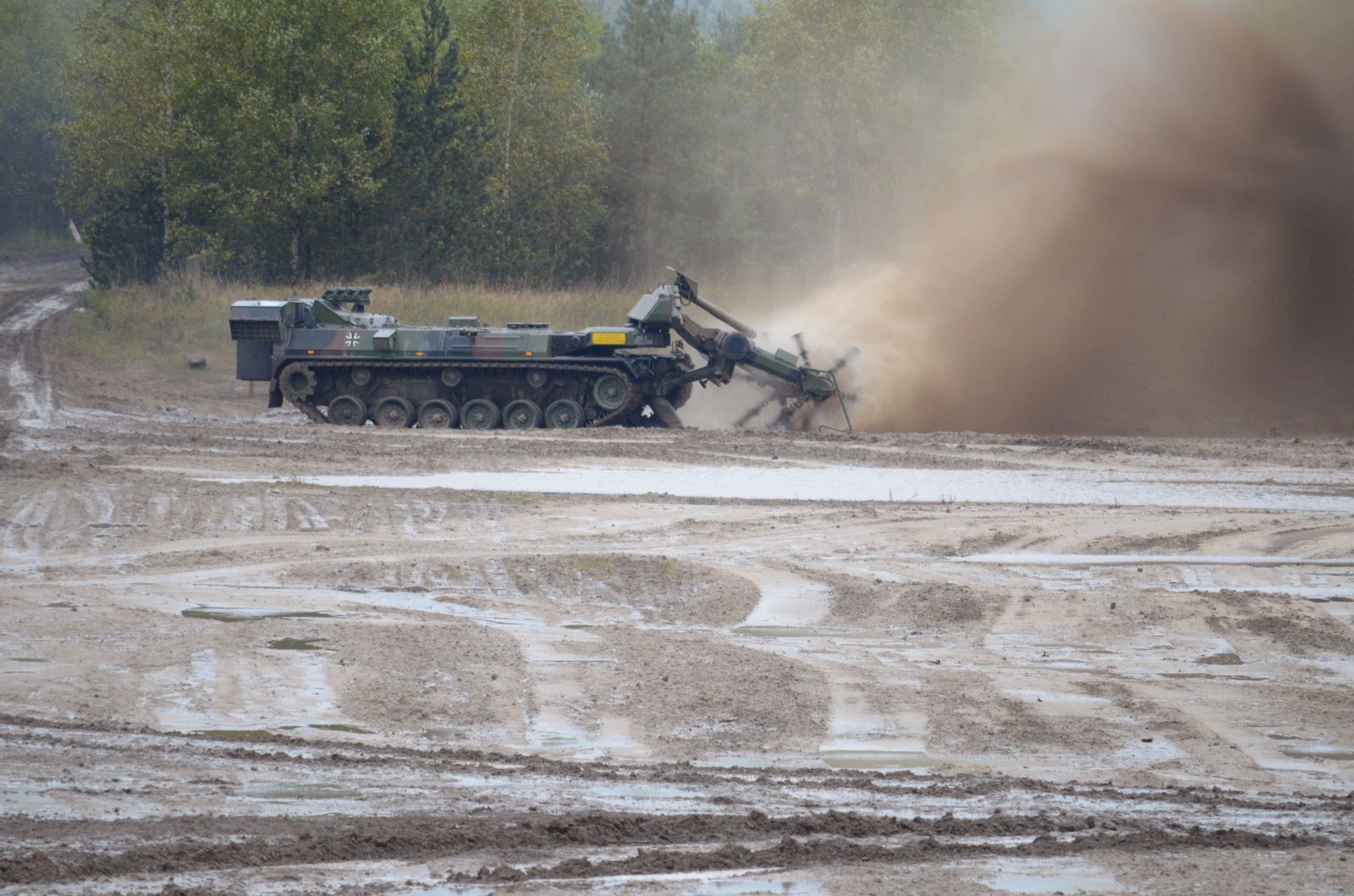
A German army Rheinmetall Keiler. It uses a heavy-duty rotor-powered mine flail, which causes mines it comes in contact with to safely detonate.

Typically based on the platform of a main battle tank, these vehicles go by different names depending upon the country of use or manufacture. In the US the term "combat engineer vehicle (CEV)" is used, in the UK the terms "Armoured Vehicle Royal Engineers (AVRE)" or Armoured Repair and Recovery Vehicle (ARRV) are used, while in Canada and other commonwealth nations the term "armoured engineer vehicle (AEV)" is used. There is no set template for what such a vehicle will look like, yet likely features include a large dozer blade or mine ploughs, a large caliber demolition cannon, augers, winches, excavator arms and cranes or lifting booms.

These vehicles are designed to directly conduct obstacle breaching operations and to conduct other earth-moving and engineering work on the battlefield. Good examples of this type of vehicle include the UK Trojan AVRE, the Russian IMR, and the US M728 Combat Engineer Vehicle. Although the term "armoured engineer vehicle" is used specifically to describe these multi-purpose tank based engineering vehicles, that term is also used more generically in British and Commonwealth militaries to describe all heavy tank based engineering vehicles used in the support of mechanized forces. Thus, "armoured engineer vehicle" used generically would refer to AEV, AVLB, Assault Breachers, and so on.

=== Armoured earth mover ===
Lighter and less multi-functional than the CEVs or AEVs described above, these vehicles are designed to conduct earth-moving work on the battlefield and generally be anti-tank explosive proof. These vehicles have greater high speed mobility than traditional heavy equipment and are protected against the effects of blast and fragmentation. Good examples are the American M9 ACE and the UK FV180 Combat Engineer Tractor.

=== Breaching vehicle ===
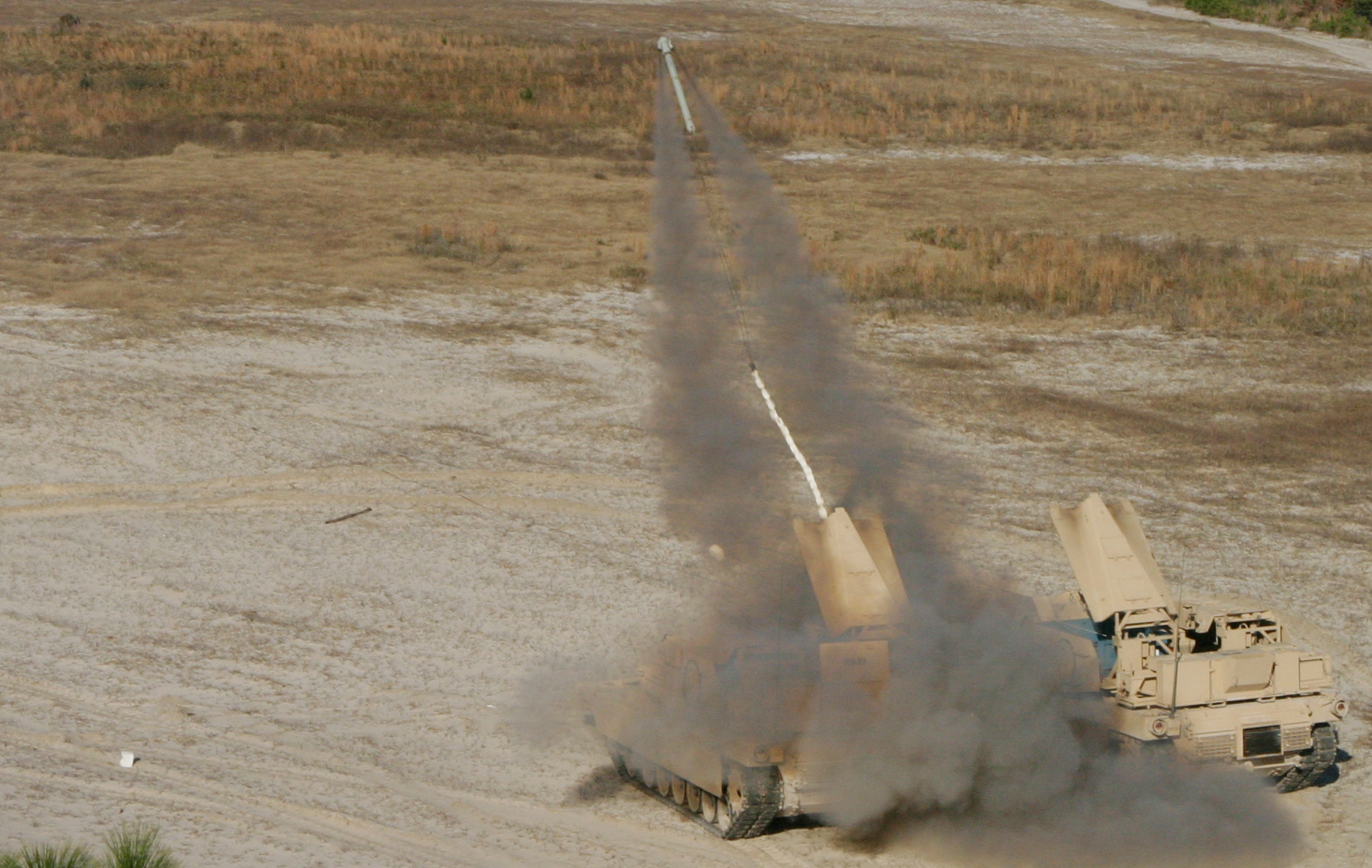
Marines with 2nd Combat Engineer Battalion launch a M58 MICLIC from an assault breacher vehicle.

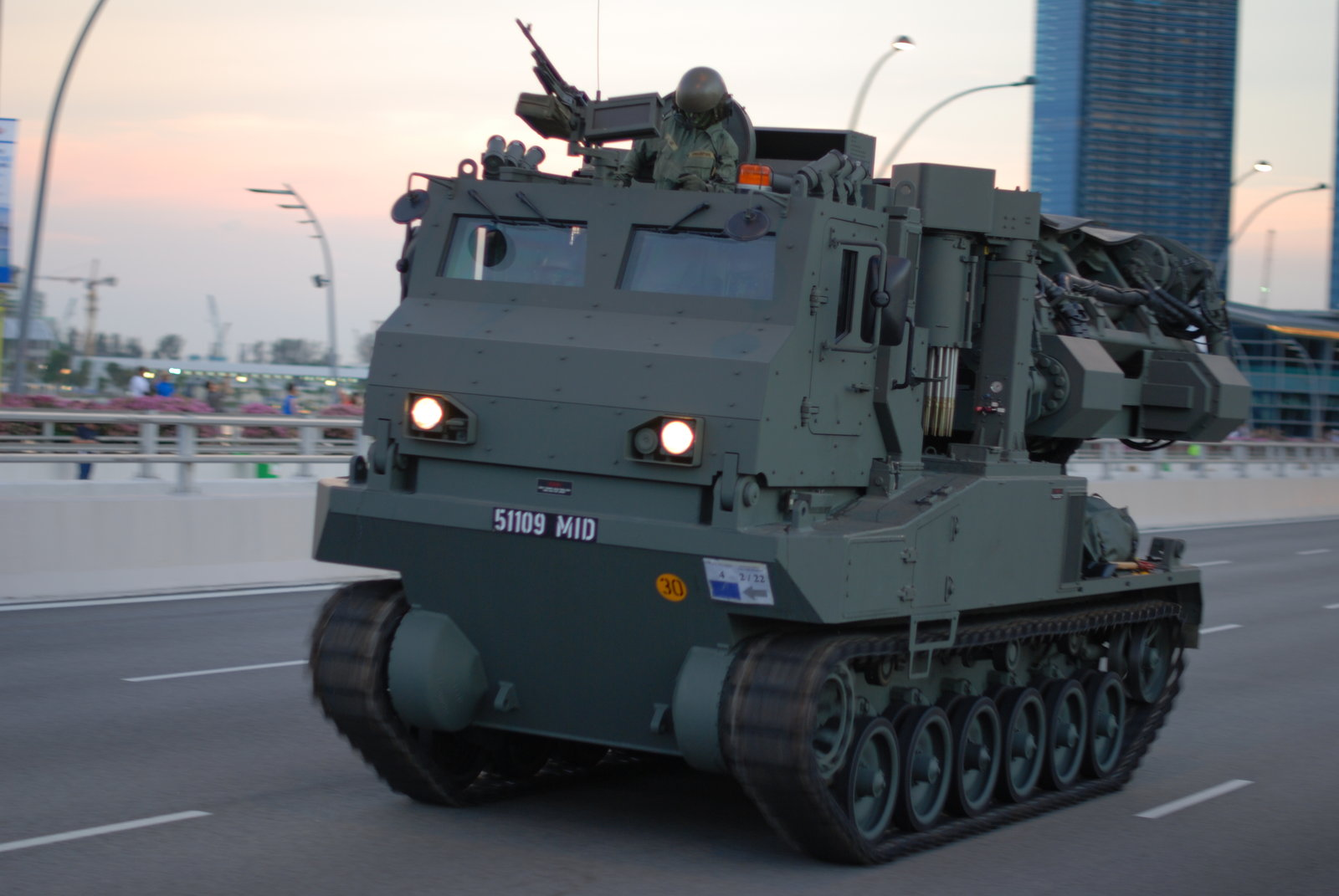
ST Engineering Bionix Trailblazer counter-mine vehicle. Note the high, stout appearance designed specifically to survive mine blasts.

These vehicles are equipped with mechanical or other means for the breaching of man-made obstacles. Common types of breaching vehicles include mechanical flails, mine plough vehicles, and mine roller vehicles. In some cases, these vehicles will also mount mine-clearing line charges. Breaching vehicles may be either converted armoured fighting vehicles or purpose built vehicles. In larger militaries, converted AFV are likely to be used as assault breachers while the breached obstacle is still covered by enemy observation and fire, and then purpose built breaching vehicles will create additional lanes for following forces.

Good examples of breaching vehicles include the US M1150 assault breacher vehicle, the UK Aardvark JSFU, and the Singaporean Trailblazer.

=== Bridging vehicles ===
U.S. Army M104 Wolverine heavy assault bridge

Several types of military bridging vehicles have been developed. An armoured vehicle-launched bridge (AVLB) is typically a modified tank hull converted to carry a bridge into battle in order to support crossing ditches, small waterways, or other gap obstacles.

Another type of bridging vehicle is the truck launched bridge. The Soviet TMM bridging truck could carry and launch a 10-meter bridge that could be daisy-chained with other TMM bridges to cross larger obstacles. More recent developments have seen the conversion of AVLB and truck launched bridge with launching systems that can be mounted on either tank or truck for bridges that are capable of supporting heavy main battle tanks.

Earlier examples of bridging vehicles include a type in which a converted tank hull is the bridge. On these vehicles, the hull deck comprises the main portion of the tread way while ramps extend from the front and rear of the vehicle to allow other vehicles to climb over the bridging vehicle and cross obstacles. An example of this type of armoured bridging vehicle was the Churchill Ark used in the Second World War.

=== Combat engineer section carriers ===
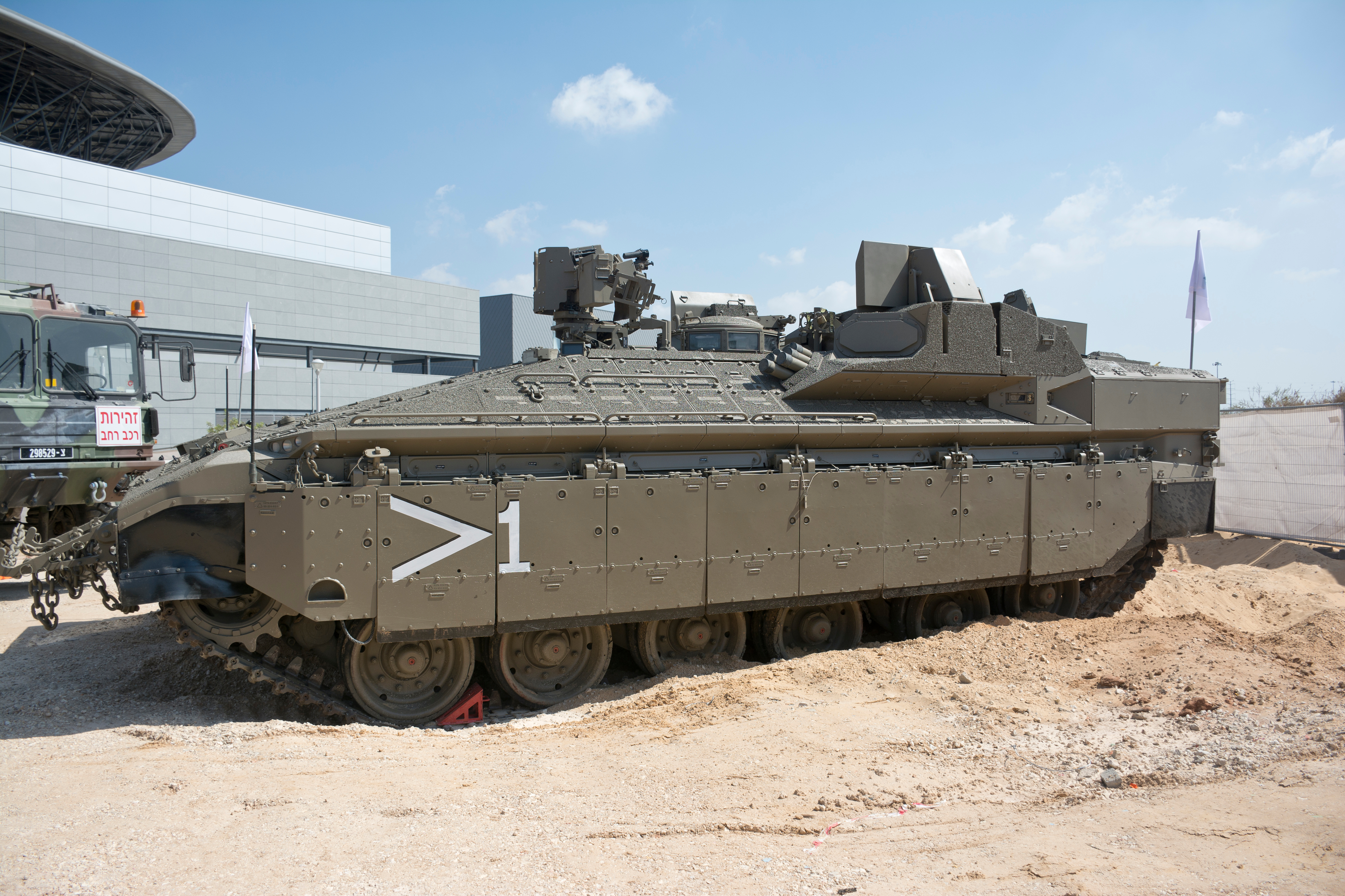
IDF Namer CEV is used both to carry section of sappers and to operate combat engineering devices.

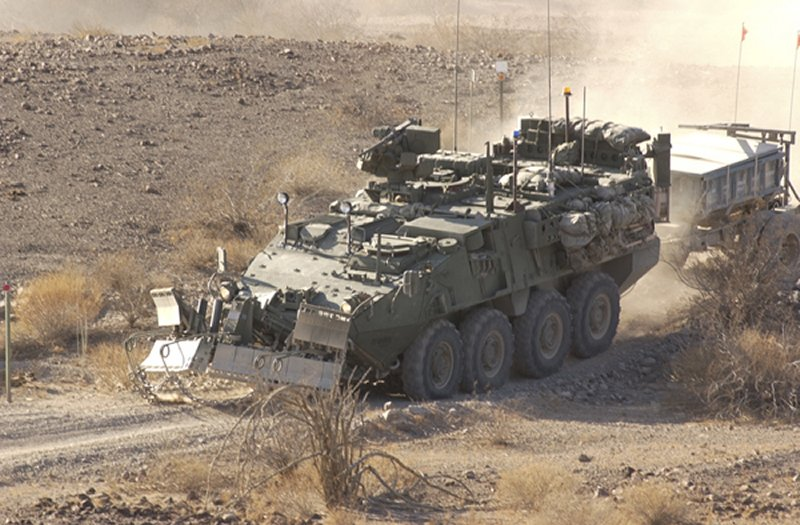
M1132 engineer squad vehicle (ESV) issued to combat engineer squads in the US Army Stryker brigade combat teams

Another type of CELLs are armoured fighting vehicles which are used to transport sappers (combat engineers) and can be fitted with a bulldozer's blade and other mine-breaching devices. They are often used as APCs because of their carrying ability and heavy protection. They are usually armed with machine guns and grenade launchers and usually tracked to provide enough tractive force to push blades and rakes. Some examples are the U.S. M113 APC, IDF Puma, Nagmachon, Husky, and U.S. M1132 ESV (a Stryker variant).

=== Military ferries and amphibious crossing vehicles ===
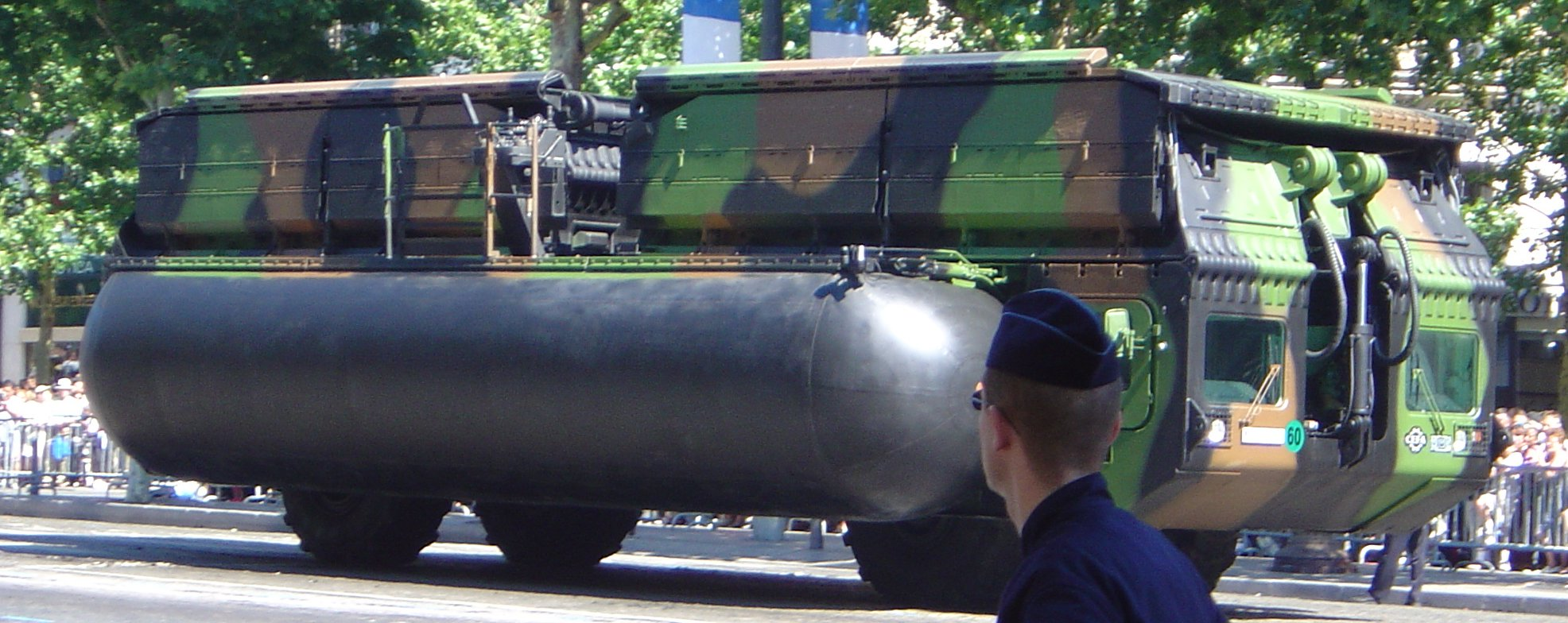
This field-deployable apparatus, known as EFA, used by the engineers of the French Army, may either be used as a bridge (deployed in a series), or as a ferry

One of the major tasks of military engineering is crossing major rivers. Several military engineering vehicles have been developed in various nations to achieve this task. One of the more common types is the amphibious ferry such as the M3 Amphibious Rig. These vehicles are self-propelled on land, they can transform into raft type ferries when in the water, and often multiple vehicles can connect to form larger rafts or floating bridges. Other types of military ferries, such as the Soviet Plavayushij Transportyor - Srednyj, are able to load while still on land and transport other vehicles cross country and over water.

In addition to amphibious crossing vehicles, military engineers may also employ several types of boats. Military assault boats are small boats propelled by oars or an outboard motor and used to ferry dismounted infantry across water.

== Tank-based combat engineering vehicles ==
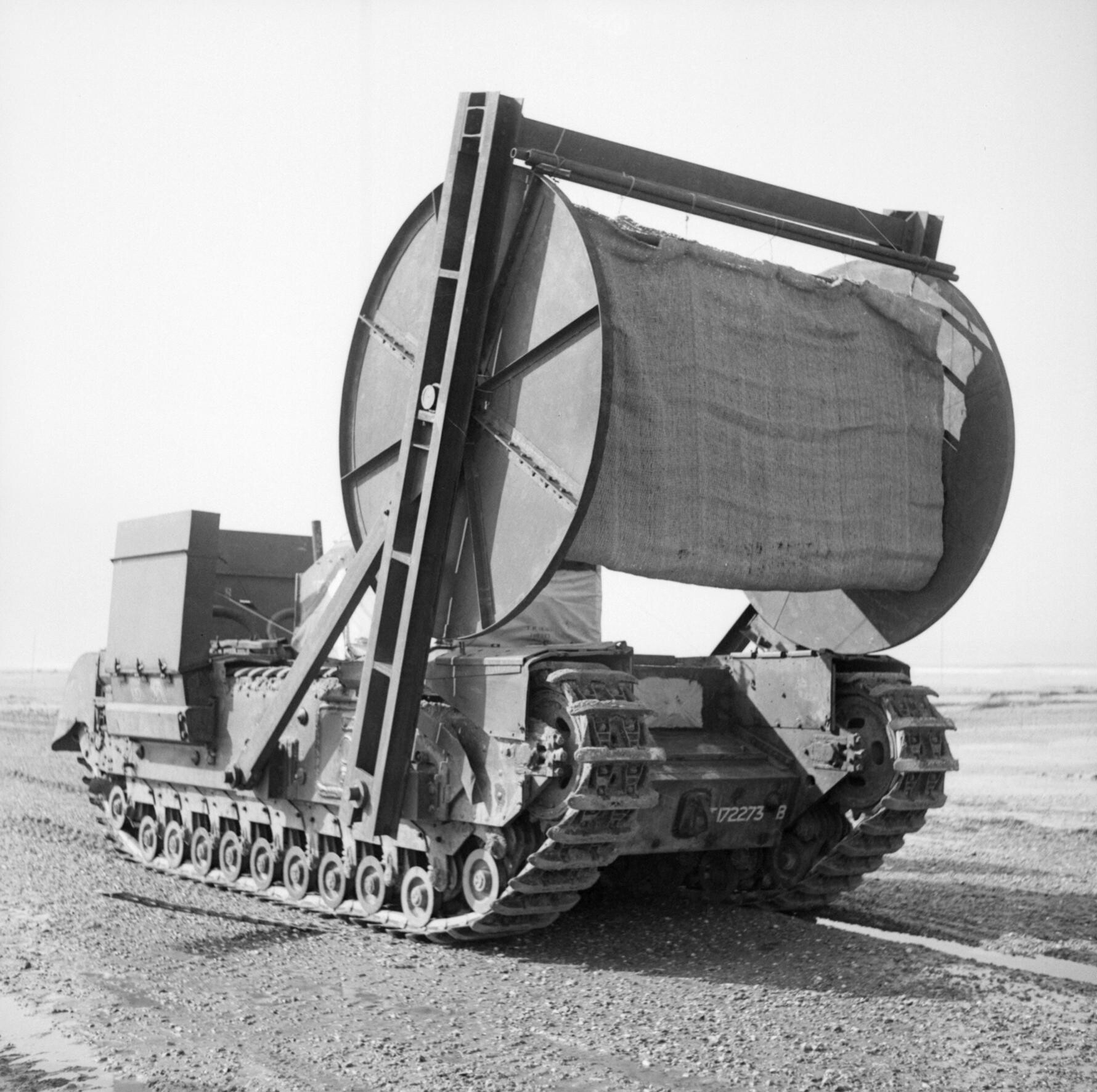
Churchill "Bobbin", a rolled roadsurface (like a chespaling mat) that could be laid for following vehicles to cross loose sand on a beach. The raised boxes at the rear of the vehicle are radiator extensions to allow deep wading in water.

Most CEVs are armoured fighting vehicles that may be based on a tank chassis and have special attachments in order to breach obstacles. Such attachments may include dozer blades, mine rollers, cranes etc. An example of an engineering vehicle of this kind is a bridgelaying tank, which replaces the turret with a segmented hydraulic bridge. The Hobart's Funnies of the Second World War were a wide variety of armoured vehicles for combat engineering tasks. They were allocated to the initial beachhead assaults by the British and Commonwealth forces in the D-Day landings.

=== Churchill tank ===
The British Churchill tank because of its good cross-country performance and capacious interior with side hatches became the most adapted with modifications, the base unit being the AVRE carrying a large demolition gun.

=== M4 Sherman ===
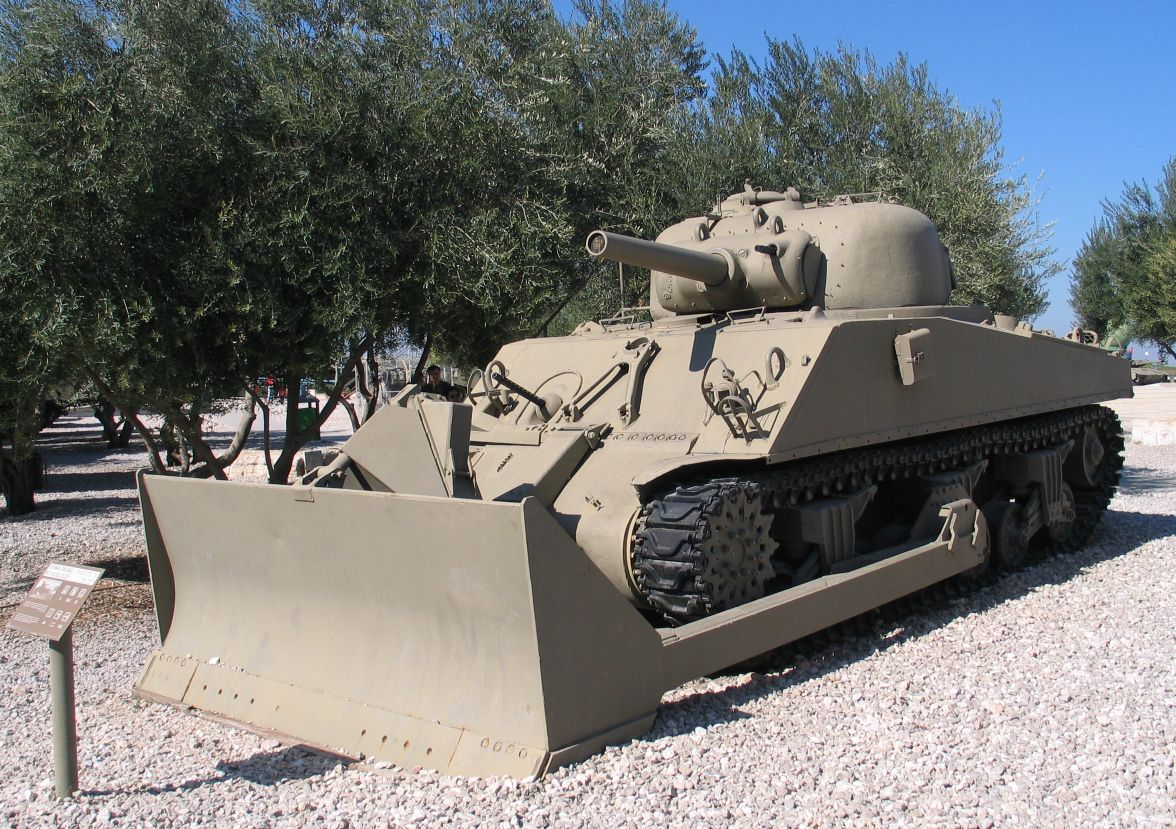
M4 with 105 mm howitzer and a dozer blade.

- Dozer: The bulldozer blade was a valuable battlefield tool on the WWII M4 Sherman tank. A 1943 field modification added the hydraulic dozer blade from a Caterpillar D8 to a Sherman. The later M1 dozer blade was standardized to fit any Sherman with VVSS suspension and the M1A1 would fit the wider HVSS. Some M4s made for the Engineer Corps had the blades fitted permanently and the turrets removed. In the early stages of the 1944 Battle of Normandy before the Culin Cutter, breaking through the Bocage hedgerows relied heavily on Sherman dozers.
- M4 Doozit: Engineer Corps' Sherman dozer with demolition charge on wooden platform and T40 Whizbang rocket launcher (the Doozit did not see combat but the Whizbang did).
- Bridgelayer: The US field-converted a few M4 in Italy with A-frame-supported bridge and heavy rear counter-weight to make the Mobile Assault Bridge. British developments for Shermans included the fascine (used by 79th Armoured Division), Crib, Twaby Ark, Octopus, Plymouth (Bailey bridge), and AVRE (SBG bridge).
- Mine-clearing: British conversions included the Sherman Crab. The US developed an extensive array of experimental types:
  - T15/E1/E2: Series of mine resistant Shermans based on the T14 kit. Cancelled at war's end.
  - Mine exploder T1E1 roller (Earthworm): Three sets of 6 discs made from armor plate.
  - Mine exploder T1E2 roller: Two forward units with 7 discs only. Experimental.
  - Mine exploder T1E3/M1 roller (Aunt Jemima): Two forward units with five 10' discs. Most widely used T1 variant, adopted as the M1. (picture)
  - Mine exploder T1E4 roller: 16 discs.
  - Mine exploder T1E5 roller: T1E3/M1 w/ smaller wheels. Experimental.
  - Mine exploder T1E6 roller: T1E3/M1 w/ serrated edged discs. Experimental
  - Mine exploder T2 flail: British Crab I mine flail.
  - Mine exploder T3 flail: Based on British Scorpion flail. Development stopped in 1943.
    - Mine exploder T3E1 flail: T3 w/ longer arms and sand filled rotor. Cancelled.
    - Mine exploder T3E2 flail: E1 variant, rotor replaced with steel drum of larger diameter. Development terminated at war's end.
  - Mine exploder T4: British Crab II mine flail.
  - Mine exploder T7: Frame with small rollers with two discs each. Abandoned.
  - Mine exploder T8 (Johnny Walker): Steel plungers on a pivot frame designed to pound on the ground. Vehicle steering was adversely affected.
  - Mine exploder T9: 6' roller. Difficult to maneuver.
    - Mine exploder T9E1: Lightened version, but proved unsatisfactory because it failed to explode all mines.
  - Mine exploder T10: Remote control unit designed to be controlled by the following tank. Cancelled.
  - Mine exploder T11: Six forward firing mortars to set off mines. Experimental.
  - Mine exploder T12: 23 forward firing mortars. Apparently effective, but cancelled.
  - Mine exploder T14: Direct modification to a Sherman tank, upgraded belly armor and reinforced tracks. Cancelled.
  - Mine excavator T4: Plough device. Developed during 1942, but abandoned.
  - Mine excavator T5/E1/E2: T4 variant w/ v-shaped plough. E1/E2 was a further improvement.
  - Mine excavator T5E3: T5E1/E2 rigged to the hydraulic lift mechanism from the M1 dozer kit to control depth.
  - Mine excavator T6: Based on the v-shape/T5, unable to control depth.
  - Mine excavator T2/E1/E2: Based on the T4/T5's, but rigged to the hydraulic lift mechanism from the M1 dozer kit to control depth.

=== M60 ===
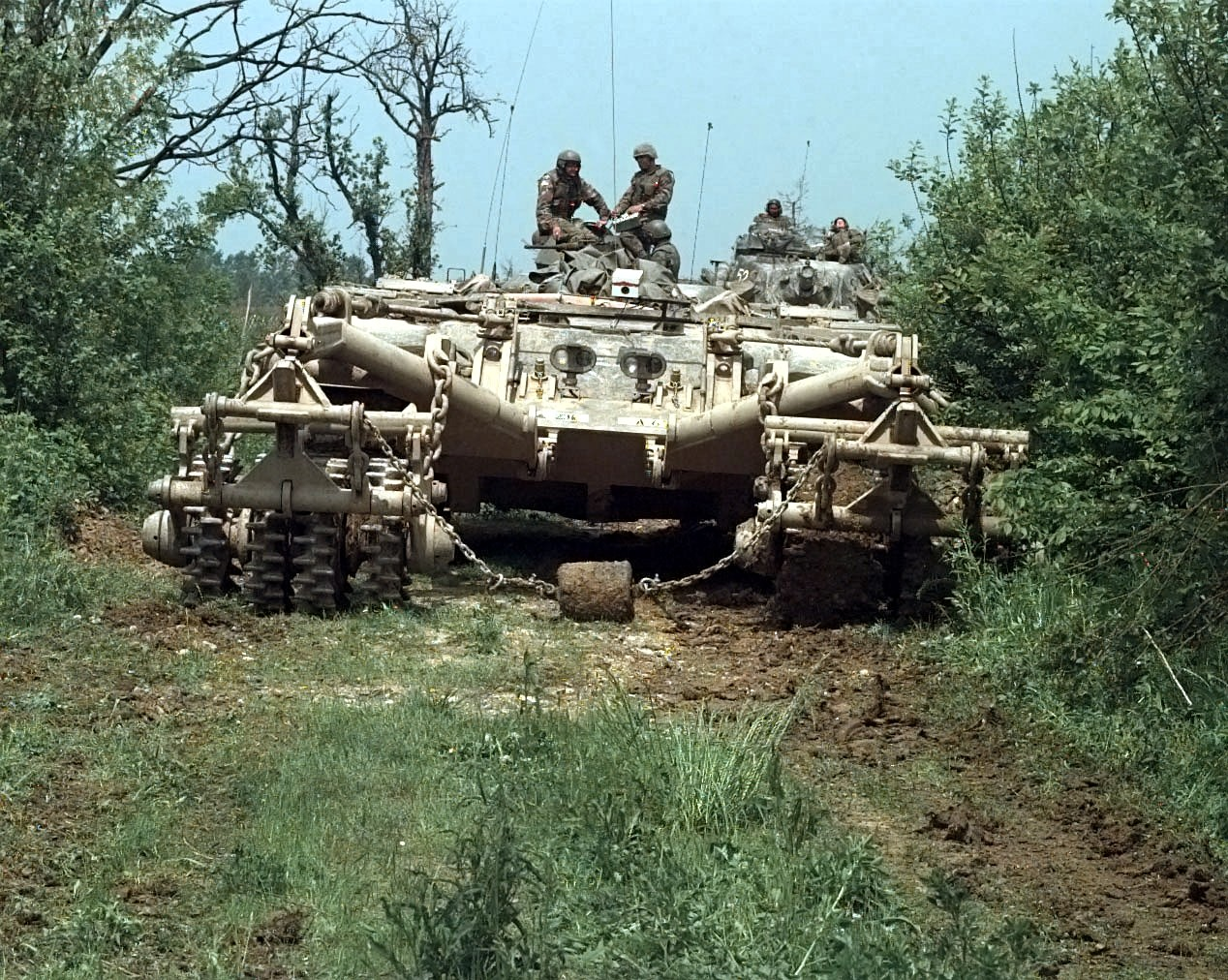
A remotely controlled Panther armored mine clearing vehicle leads a column down a road in Bosnia and Herzegovina, May 16, 1996.

- M60A1 AVLB – Armored vehicle launched bridge, 60-foot (18 m) scissors bridge on M60A1 chassis.
- M60 AVLM – armored vehicle launched MICLIC (mine-clearing line charge), modified M60 AVLB with up to 2 MICLIC mounted over the rear of the vehicle.
- M60 Panther – M60 modified into a remotely controlled mine clearing tank. The turret is removed with the turret ring sealed, and the front of the vehicle is fitted with mine rollers.
- M728 CEV – M60A1-based combat engineer vehicle fitted with a folding A-frame crane and winch attached to the front of the turret, and an M135 165 mm demolition gun. Commonly fitted with the D7 bulldozer blade, or a mine-clearing equipment.
  - M728A1 – Upgraded version of the M728 CEV.

=== M1 ===
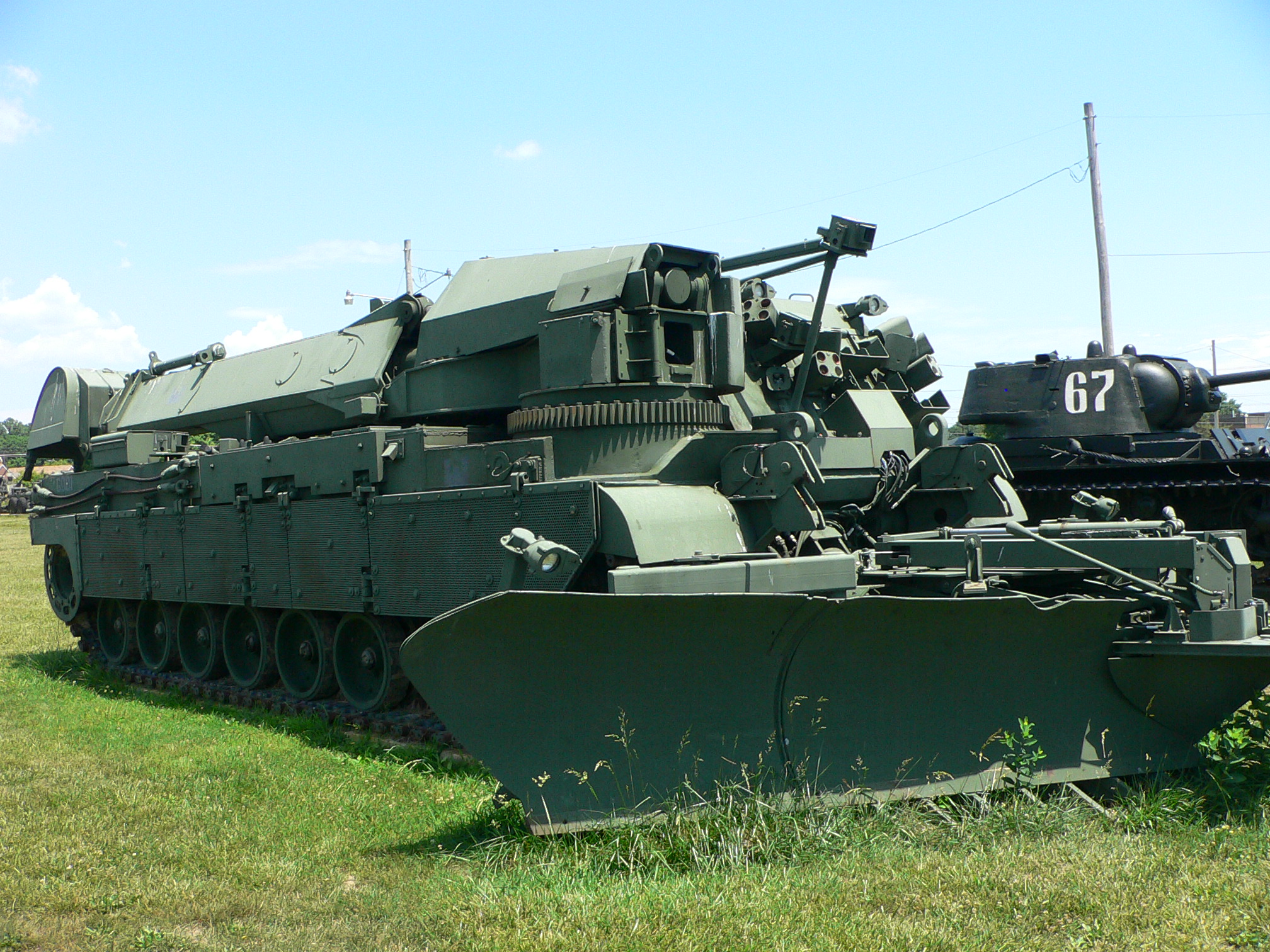
Grizzly combat mobility vehicle (CMV)

- M1 Grizzly combat mobility vehicle (CMV) Grizzly breacher
- M1 Panther II remote controlled mine clearing vehicle Panther
- M104 Wolverine heavy assault bridge Wolverine (heavy assault bridge)
- M1074 Joint Assault Bridge System
- M1150 assault breacher vehicle

=== Leopard 1 ===
- Biber (Beaver) armoured vehicle-launched bridge
- Pionierpanzer 1
- Pionierpanzer 2 Dachs (Badger) armoured engineer vehicle

=== Leopard 2 ===
- Panzerschnellbrücke 2 (Bridge layer)
- Pionierpanzer 3 Kodiak

=== T-55/54 ===
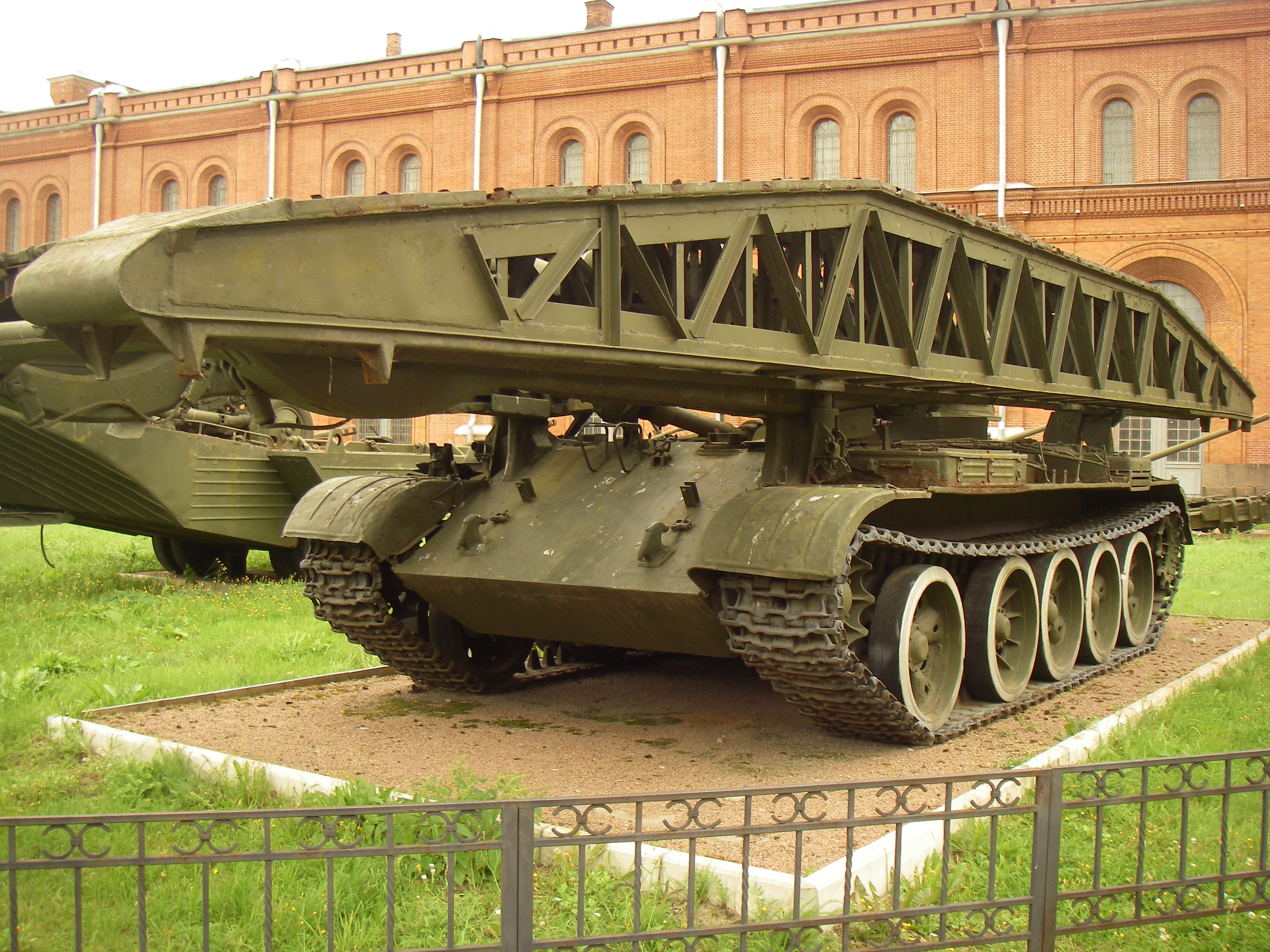
MTU-12 bridgelayer

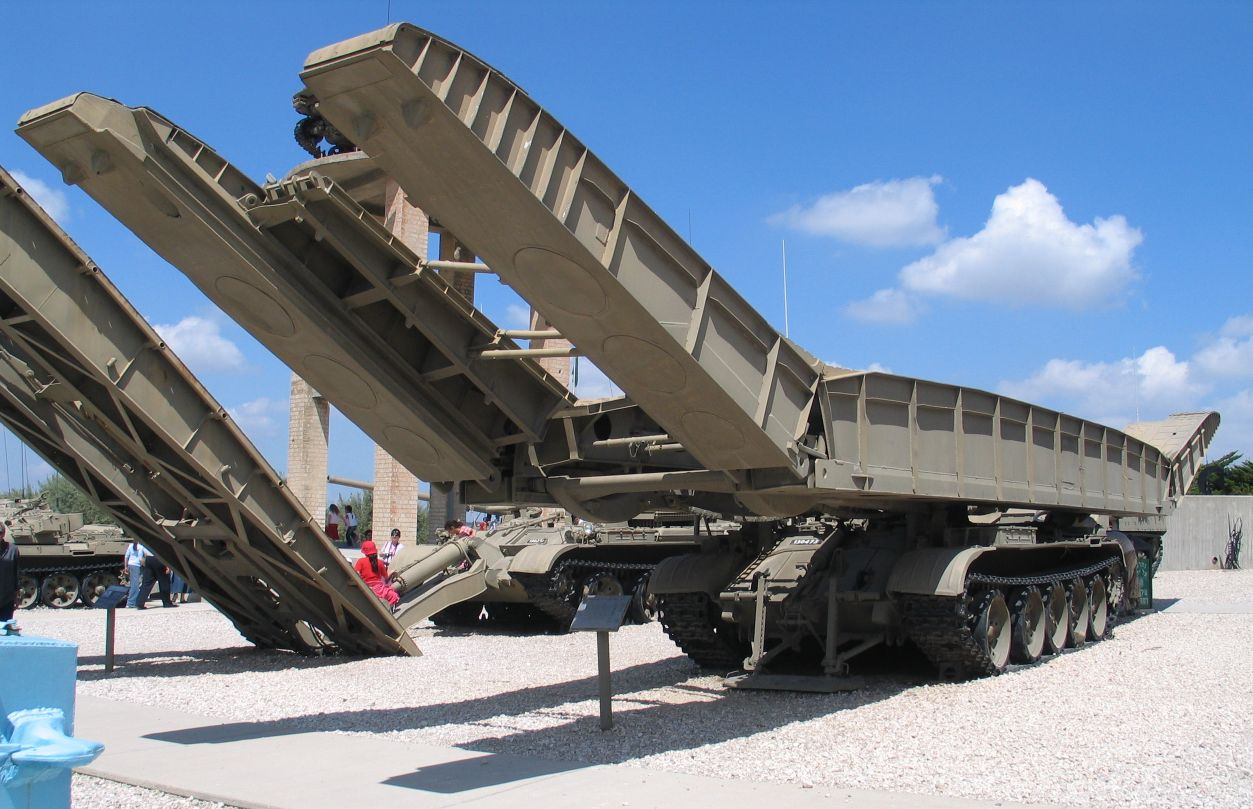
MTU-20 bridgelayer

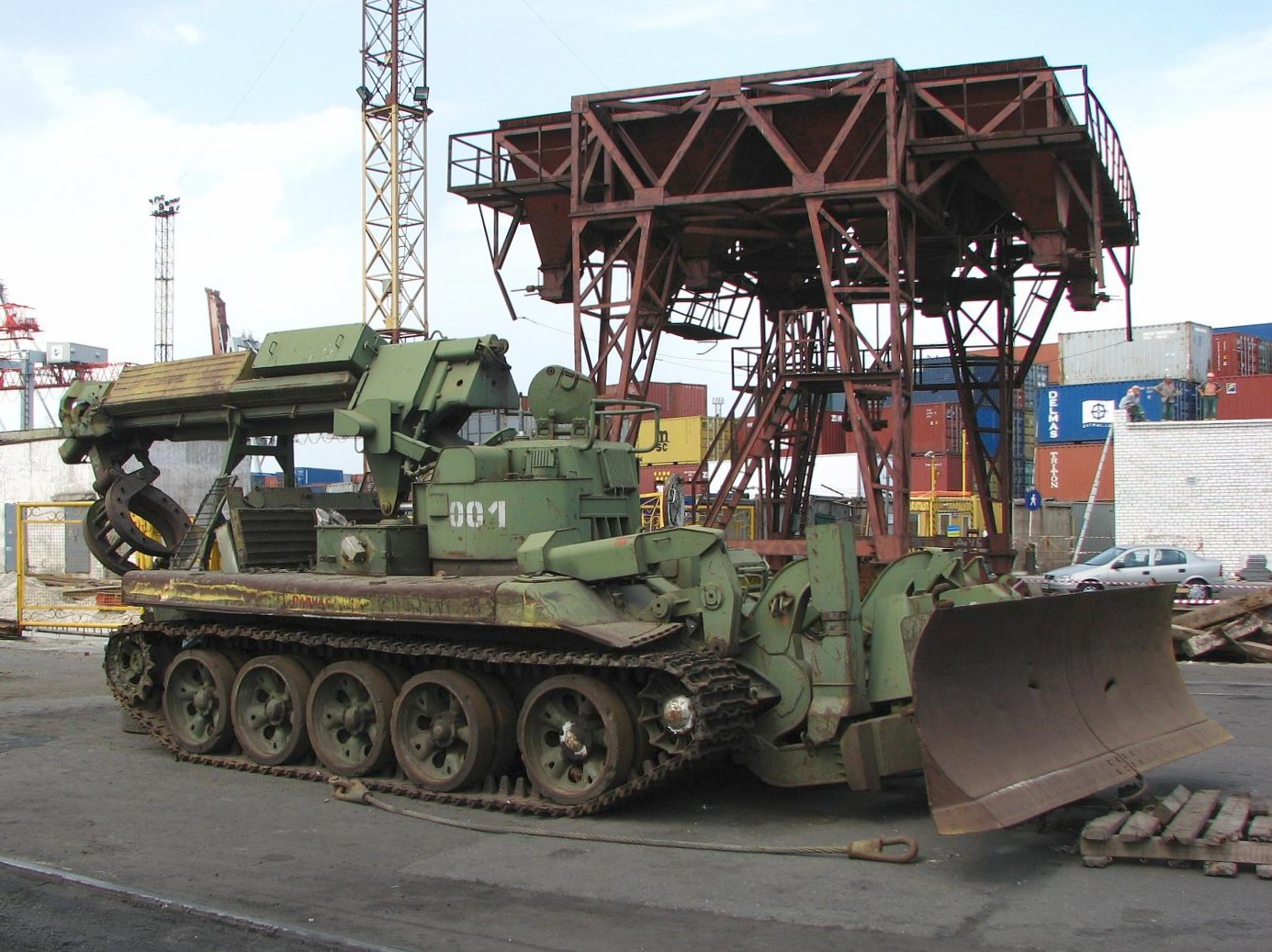
IMR combat engineering vehicle

- T-54 dozer - T-54 fitted with bulldozer blades for clearing soil, obstacles and snow.
- ALT-55 - Bulldozer version of the T-55 with large flat-plate superstructure, angular concave dozer blade on front and prominent hydraulic rams for dozer blade.
- T-55 hull fitted with an excavator body and armoured cab.
- T-55 MARRS - Fitted with a Vickers armoured recovery vehicle kit. It has a large flat-plate turret with slightly chamfered sides, vertical rear and very chamfered front and a large A-frame crane on the front of the turret. The crane has cylindrical winch rope fed between legs of crane. A dozer blade is fitted to the hull front.
- MT-55 or MTU-55 (Tankoviy Mostoukladchik) - Soviet designator for Czechoslovak MT-55A bridge-layer tank with scissors bridge.
- MTU-12 (Tankoviy Mostoukladchik)- Bridge-layer tank with 12 m single-span bridge that can carry 50 tonnes. The system entered service in 1955; today only a very small number remains in service. Combat weight: 34 tonnes.
- MTU-20 (Ob'yekt 602) (Tankoviy Mostoukladchik) - The MTU-20 consists of a twin-treadway superstructure mounted on a modified T-54 tank chassis. Each treadway is made up of a box-type aluminum girder with a folding ramp attached to both ends to save space in the travel position. Because of that the vehicle with the bridge on board is only 11.6 m long, but the overall span length is 20 m. This is an increase of about 62% over that of the older MTU-1. The bridge is launched by the cantilever method. First the ramps are lowered and fully extended before the treadways are forward with the full load of the bridge resting on the forward support plate during launch. The span is moved out over the launching girder until the far end reaches the far bank. Next the near end is lowered onto the near bank. This method of launching gives the bridgelayer a low silhouette which makes it less vulnerable to detection and destruction.
  - MTU-20 based on the T-55 chassis.
- BTS-1 (Bronetankoviy Tyagach Sredniy - Medium Armoured Tractor) - This is basically a turretless T-54A with a stowage basket.
  - BTS-1M - improved or remanufactured BTS-1.
- BTS-2 (Ob'yekt 9) (Bronetankoviy Tyagach Sredniy - Medium Armoured Tractor) - BTS-1 upgraded with a hoist and a small folding crane with a capacity of 3,000 kg. It was developed on the T-54 hull in 1951; series production started in 1955. The prototype Ob.9 had a commander's cupola with DShK 1938/46 machine gun, but the production model has a square commander's hatch, opening to the right. Combat weight: 32 tons. Only a very small number remains in service.
- BTS-3 (Bronetankoviy Tyagach Sredniy - Medium Armoured Tractor) - JVBT-55A in service with the Soviet Army.
- BTS-4 (Bronetankoviy Tyagach Sredniy - Medium Armoured Tractor) - Similar to BTS-2 but with snorkel. In the West generally known as T-54T. There are many different models, based on the T-44, T-54, T-55 and T-62.
- BTS-4B - Dozer blade equipped armoured recovery vehicle converted from the early -odd-shaped turret versions of the T-54.
  - BTS-4BM - Experimental version of the BTS-4B with the capacity to winch over the front of the vehicle.
- IMR (Ob'yekt 616) (Inzhenernaya Mashina Razgrazhdeniya) - Combat engineer vehicle. It's a T-55 that had its turret replaced with a hydraulically operated 2t crane. The crane can also be fitted with a small bucket or a pair of pincer type grabs for removing trees and other obstacles. A hydraulically operated dozer blade mounts to the front of the hull; it can be used in a straight or V-configuration only. The IMR was developed in 1969 and entered service five years later.
- SPK-12G (Samokhodniy Pod’yomniy Kran) - Heavy crane mounted on T-55 chassis. Only two were built.
- BMR-2 (Boyevaya Mashina Razminirovaniya) - Mine clearing tank based on T-55 chassis. This vehicle has no turret but a fixed superstructure, armed with an NSVT machine gun. It is fitted with a KMT-7 mine clearing set and entered service around 1987 during the war in Afghanistan.
  - Improved version of BMR-2 that has been seen fitted with a wide variety of mine roller designs.

=== T-64 ===
- BAT-2 – Fast combat engineering vehicle with the lower hull and "small roadwheels" & suspension of the T-64. KMDB - Vehicles Based on the MT-T Prime Mover Chassis. The vehicle is powered by a V-64-4 multi-fuel diesel engine, developing 700 hp. This engine is derived from that, used on the T-72 main battle tank. The 40-ton tractor sports a very large, all axis adjustable V-shaped hydraulic dozer blade at the front, a single soil ripper spike at the rear and a 2-ton crane on the top. The crew compartment holds 8 persons (driver, commander, radio operators plus a five-man sapper squad for dismounted tasks). The highly capable BAT-2 was designed to replace the old T-54/AT-T based BAT-M, but Warsaw Pact allies received only small numbers due to its high price and the old and new vehicles served alongside each other

=== T-72 ===
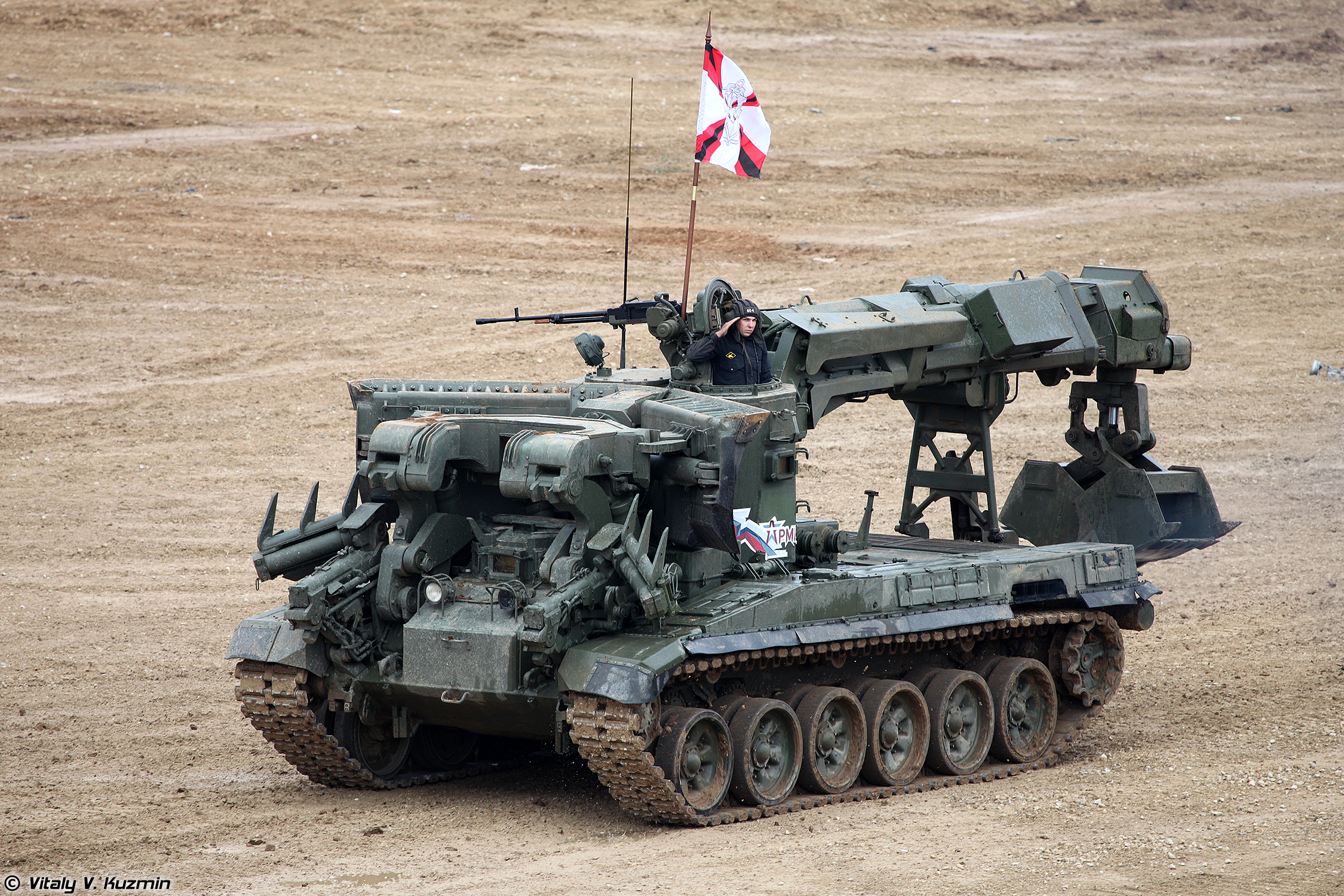
IMR-3M combat engineering vehicle with the dozer blade stowed in the transport position.

- IMR-2 (Inzhenernaya Mashina Razgrashdeniya) - Combat engineering vehicle (CEV). It has a telescoping crane arm which can lift between 5 and 11 metric tons and utilizes a pincers for uprooting trees. Pivoted at the front of the vehicle is a dozer blade that can be used in a V-configuration or as a straight dozer blade. When not required it is raised clear of the ground. On the vehicle's rear, a mine-clearing system is mounted.
  - IMR-2M1 - Simplified model without the mine-clearing system. Entered service in 1987.
  - IMR-2M2 - Improved version that is better suited for operations in dangerous situations, for example in contaminated areas. It entered service in 1990 and has a modified crane arm with bucket instead off the pincers.
  - IMR-2MA - Latest version with bigger operator's cabin armed with a 12.7 mm machine gun NSV.
    - Klin-1 - Remote controlled IMR-2.
- MTU-72 (Ob'yekt 632) (Tankovyj Mostoukladchik) - bridge layer based on T-72 chassis. The overall layout and operating method of the system are similar to those of the MTU-20 and MTU bridgelayers. The bridge, when laid, has an overall length of 20 meters. The bridge has a maximum capacity of 50,000 kg, is 3.3 meters wide, and can span a gap of 18 m. By itself, the bridge weighs 6400 kg. The time required to lay the bridge is 3 minutes, and 8 minutes for retrieval.
- BLP 72 (Brückenlegepanzer) - The East-German army had plans to develop a new bridgelayer tank that should have been ready for series production from 1987 but after several difficulties the project was canceled.

== See also ==
- AM 50 automatically launched assault bridge
- Armored bulldozer
- Armoured recovery vehicle
- Armoured Vehicle Royal Engineers
- Bulldozer
- Caterpillar D9
- Combat engineer
- List of Japanese Army military engineer vehicles of World War II
- Sapper
- Terrier armoured combat engineer vehicle
