= Ivanovka (disambiguation), =

Ivanovka may refer to:

- Ivanovka, Azerbaijan, a village and municipality in Ismayilli District of Azerbaijan
- Ivanovka, Kyrgyzstan, a village in Ysyk-Ata District, Kyrgyzstan
- Ivanovka, Russia, several rural localities in Russia
- Ivanovka estate, near Tambov, Russia

== See also ==
- Ivanivka (disambiguation), the equivalent Ukrainian-language name
