= Terrier armoured digger =

Terrier combat engineer vehicle
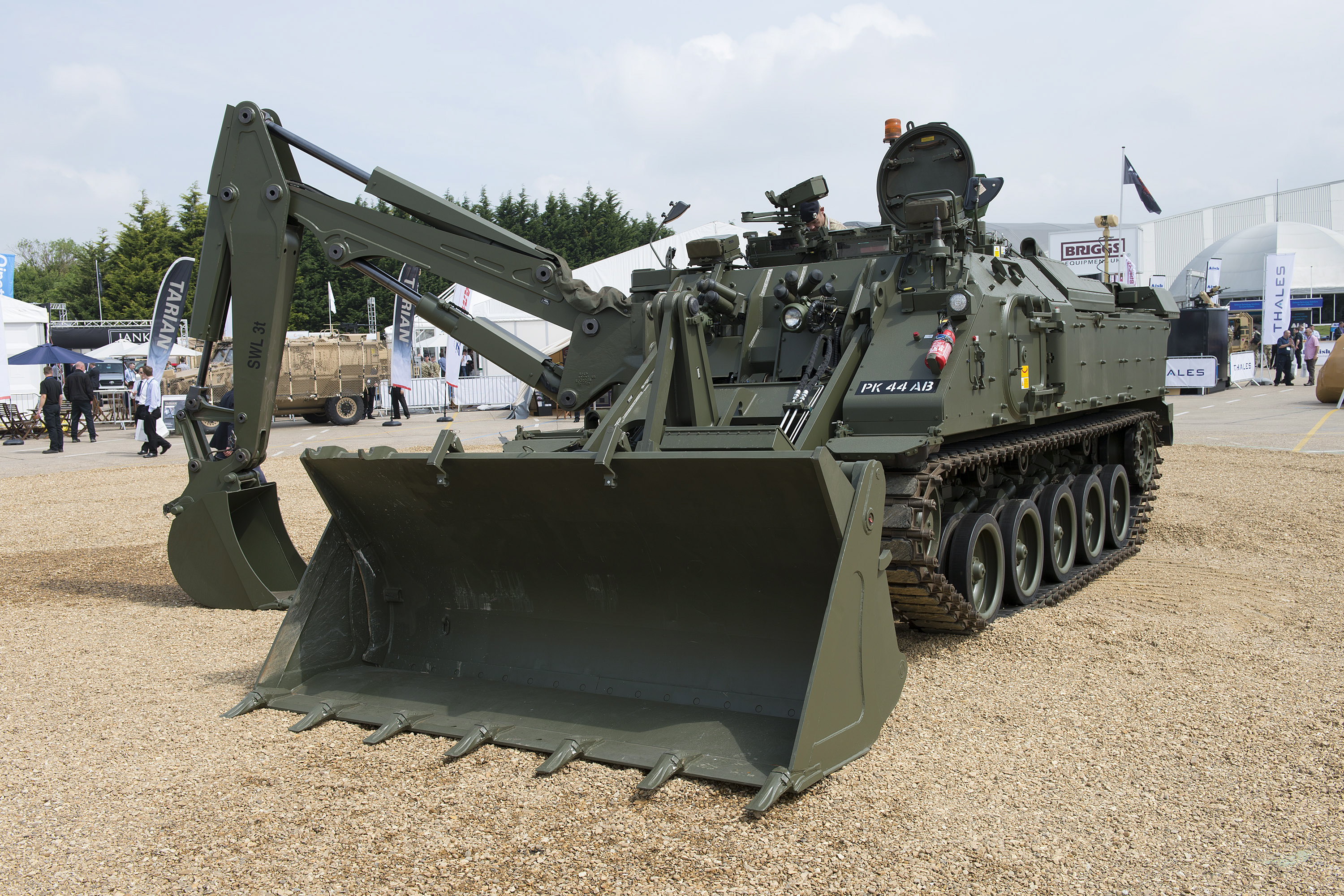
- Type: Combat engineer vehicle
- Place of origin: United Kingdom

Production history
- Designer: RO Defence
- Designed: 2002-2005
- Manufacturer: BAE Systems Land (UK)
- Produced: 2010-2014
- No. built: 60

Specifications
- Mass: 31.5 t (31.0 long tons; 34.7 short tons)
- Length: 9.3 m (30 ft 6 in) overall
- Width: 2.96 m (9 ft 9 in)
- Height: 2.8 m (9 ft 2 in) overall
- Crew: 2
- Armour: Steel
- Main armament: 7.62mm machine gun
- Engine: Caterpillar C18 diesel 520 kW (700 hp)
- Power/weight: 16.6 kW/t (22.2 hp/t)
- Drive: Tracked
- Transmission: Allison X300-10 automatic
- Suspension: Hydropneumatic
- Fuel capacity: 680 L (150 imp gal; 180 US gal)
- Operational range: 600 km (370 mi)
- Maximum speed: 70 km/h (43 mph) on-road; 40 km/h (25 mph) cross-country
- References: Janes

The Terrier vehicle is an air-transportable armoured combat engineer vehicle for the Royal Engineers. It was developed as a replacement vehicle for the FV180 Combat Engineer Tractor used by the British Army.

== Design ==
The vehicle weighs about 30 tonnes, light enough to be air transportable by C-17 Globemaster III or Airbus A400M.

A clamshell front bucket and side-mounted excavator arm will allow the vehicle to perform earth-moving and obstacle-removing tasks. It will have mine protection and can be operated by remote control from up to 1,000 m (3,300 ft) in dangerous environments such as mine clearance. In normal operations it will have a crew of two. It has enhanced modular armour and will be faster at up to 70 km/h (43 mph) and more mobile than the FV180 Combat Engineer Tractor, and has 360-degree day-and-night-vision systems.

The contract to design and build the vehicle was won by BAE Systems Land and Armaments in the UK in July 2002.

Other companies have been subcontracted to provide expertise in specific areas. These companies, together with an indication of their involvement, include:

- GKN Aerospace: innovative fuel system
- Caterpillar Inc.: powerpacks and C18 Caterpillar 700 brake horsepower (520 kW) engine
- Corus: fabricated hull

== History ==
A prototype vehicle was officially unveiled on 28 May 2005.

BAE Systems built four demonstrator vehicles for trials. They went into production in their factory at Newcastle upon Tyne. A re-baselined Terrier programme was on track with reliability growth trials contracted for early 2010. Manufacture of the first TERRIER production hull began on 27 January 2010 at the company's Newcastle plant. The vehicle is in service as of 5 June 2013. A total of 60 vehicles were delivered to the British Army.

The French Military has shown an interest in purchasing Terriers from the UK.

== Crew training ==
Training of the Terrier crews is carried out in the Terrier Mission Crew Trainer (MCT) developed by BAE Systems Integrated System Technologies (Insyte) at their plant in Fife, Scotland. The trainer comprises a high fidelity simulated crew cab, with commander and driver positions, mounted on a motion platform, and surrounded by a 360 degree, rear projection, visual system. The MCT allows crews simulate driving, digging and other vehicle functions. Four MCTs are in development for the British Army.
