= Ivanivka Raion =

Ivanivka Raion (Ukrainian: Іванівський район) may refer to two raions in Ukraine.

- Ivanivka Raion, Odesa Oblast
- Ivanivka Raion, Kherson Oblast

== See also ==
- Ivanovsky District
- Ivanivka (disambiguation)
