= Dikiy =

Dikiy (Russian: Дикий) is a Russian surname meaning "wild" in Russian. Less common transliterations include Dikii and Dikij

Notable people with the surname include:

- Aleksei Dikiy (1889–1955), Soviet actor
- Andrey Dikiy (1893–1977), Russian writer

== See also ==
- Dykyi
