= IMR-2 =

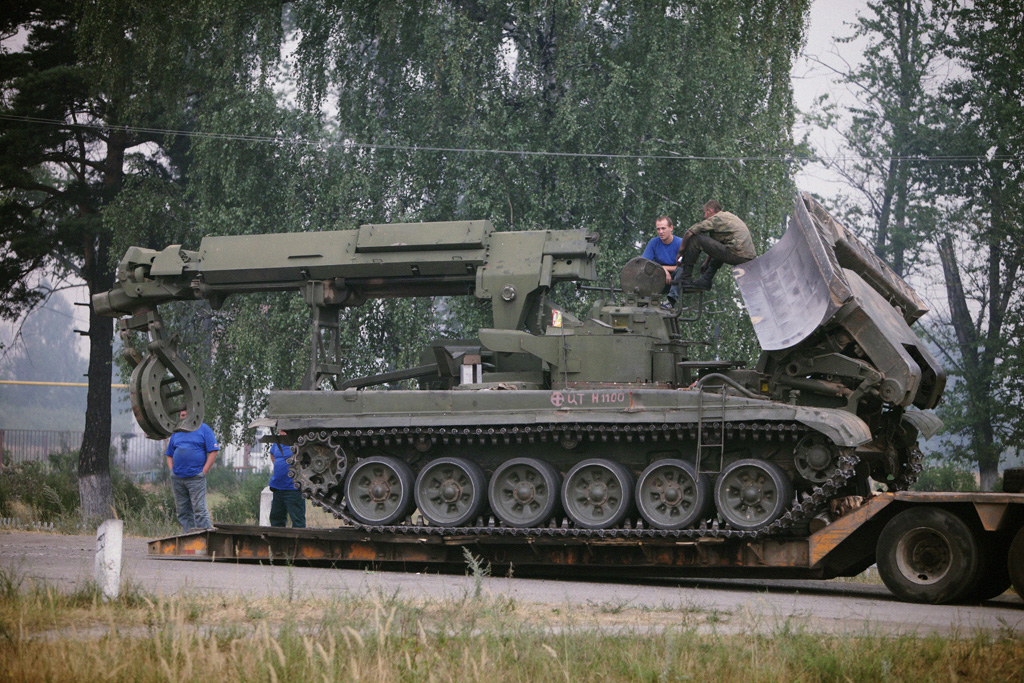
- IMR
- Type: Heavy combat engineering vehicle
- Place of origin: Soviet Union

Service history
- In service: 1982–present
- Wars: Soviet–Afghan War; First Chechen War; Second Chechen War; Syrian Civil War; 2020 Nagorno-Karabakh conflict Russian invasion of Ukraine

Production history
- Designer: UVZ
- Manufacturer: UVZ
- Produced: 1982–1990
- No. built: 659

Specifications
- Mass: 44.3 tonnes
- Length: 9.55 m (31 ft 4 in)
- Width: 4.35 m (14 ft 3 in)
- Height: 3.68 m (12 ft 1 in)
- Crew: 2
- Armor: Protection against small arms and shell splinters
- Main armament: 1× 12.7 mm NSV machine gun
- Engine: V-84MS V-12 turbocharged diesel engine 840 hp
- Power/weight: 19 hp/tonne
- Suspension: torsion bar
- Operational range: 500 km
- Maximum speed: 50 km/h (31 mph)

The IMR-2 is a Soviet and Russian tracked military engineering vehicle built on the chassis of the T-72 main battle tank. IMR stands for Inzhenernaya Mashina Razgrazhdeniya (Russian: инженерная машина разграждения-2; ИМР-2), meaning "Clearing Engineering Vehicle".

Development of the IMR-2 began in the 1970s and was completed in 1980. Series production commenced in 1982. The IMR-2 was developed to replace the aging IMR, which was built on the basis of the T-54/55 tank. It is in service with the Russian Army and some foreign militaries. It took part in the Soviet–Afghan War, First Chechen War, Second Chechen War, Russian invasion of Ukraine and was in addition used in relief operations after the Chernobyl disaster.

== Design ==
The IMR-2 was derived from the chassis of the T-72 main battle tank. The turret of the T-72 was replaced with a new rotating multipurpose telescopic crane. The IMR-2 has a bulldozer blade fitted on the front of the hull, which has a v-shape and a straight shape and a 200–250 m^{3}/h capacity. When not required, the blade is folded upwards. Stone barriers can be cleared at the rate of 280 to 350 meter an hour while trenches and tree barriers can be filled in at the rate of 350 to 400 m^{3}/h.

A 12.7 mm NSVT machine gun is mounted on the crew operator/commander cabin, for the self-protection of the vehicle.

== Propulsion ==
The IMR-2 is powered by a multi-fuel water-cooled diesel engine V-84Ms developing 840 hp, the same engine used in the T-72. It can run at a maximum road speed of 50 km/h with a maximum range of 500 km. The IMR-2 uses the same torsion bar suspension as the T-72, which consists of six road wheels on each side. It is operated by a two-man crew.

== Variants ==
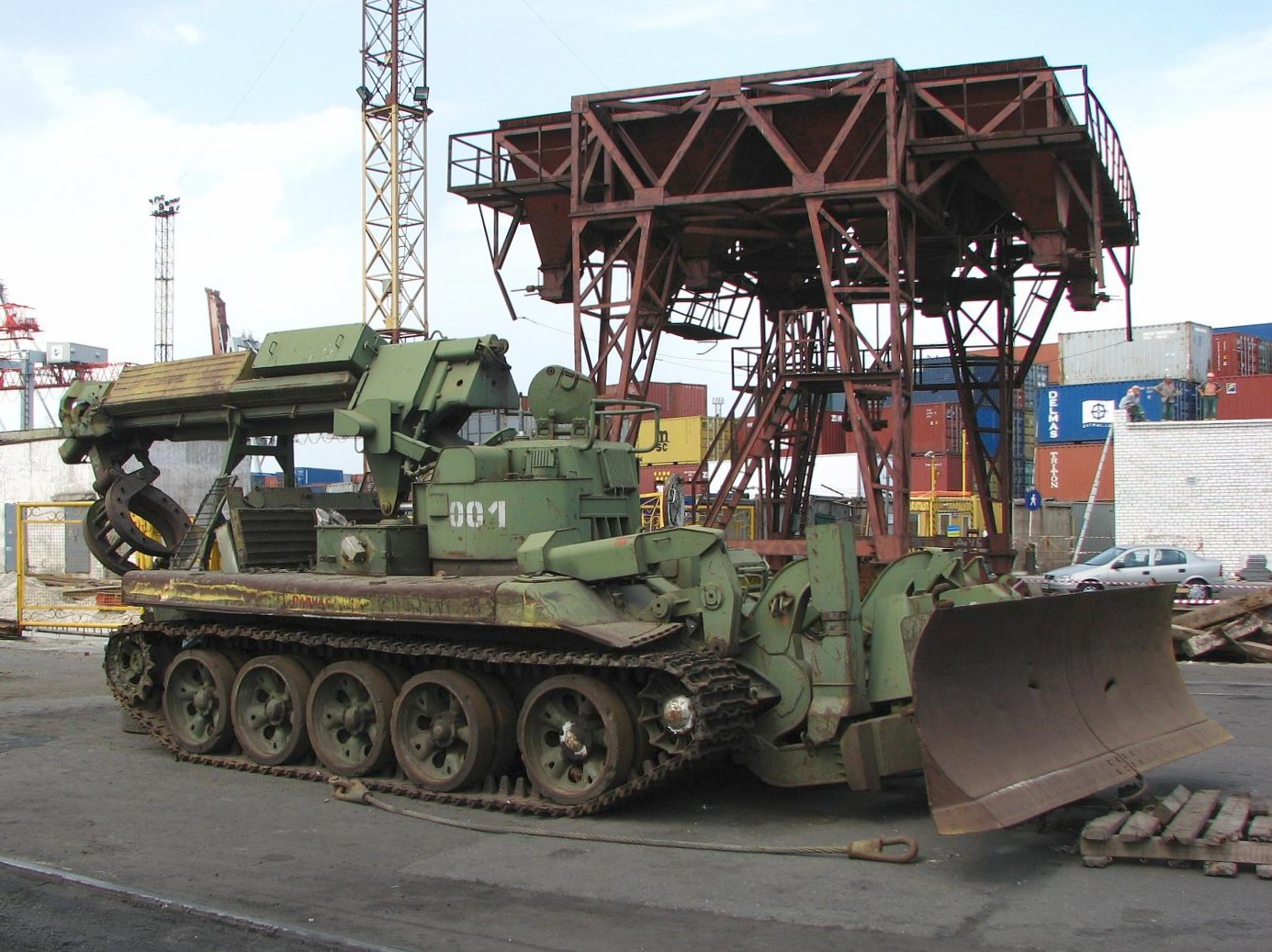
IMR built on a T-55 hull in Odesa

- IMR: First version of combat engineering vehicle built on T-54/55 medium battle tank chassis, powered by a V-55 diesel engine developing 520 hp.
- IMR-2M1: Simplified model without the mine-clearing system. Entered service in 1982. Based on T-72A tank hull.
- IMR-2M2: Improved version that is better suited for operations in dangerous situations, for example in contaminated areas. It entered service in 1990 and has a modified crane arm with bucket instead off the pincers.
- IMR-2MA: Latest version with bigger operator's cabin armed with a 12.7 mm machine gun NSV.
- Klin-1: Remote controlled IMR-2.
- IMR-3M: Combat engineering vehicle built on the T-90 main battle tank chassis. The vehicle is 9,320 mm long, 3,500 mm wide and 3,430 mm high and weighs 49.5 t with the KMT-RZ minesweeping device. The IMR-3M is powered by an 840-hp V-84MS multifuel diesel engine, producing a maximum speed of 60 km/h and a range of 500 km. The baseline AEV is fitted with a U-type dozer blade, jib-type crane with an excavator bucket, and minesweeping plow. A chemical, biological, radiological and nuclear [CBRN] reconnaissance device, smokescreen generator, advanced signal suite and automatic fire extinguisher are fitted. The IMR-3M is armed with an NSVT 12.7 mm heavy machinegun [HMG] in a remotely controlled station. Production started in 2016 and is currently ongoing. IMR-3M is capable of fording water barriers up to 5 m deep along the bottom.
