= FV180 Combat Engineer Tractor =

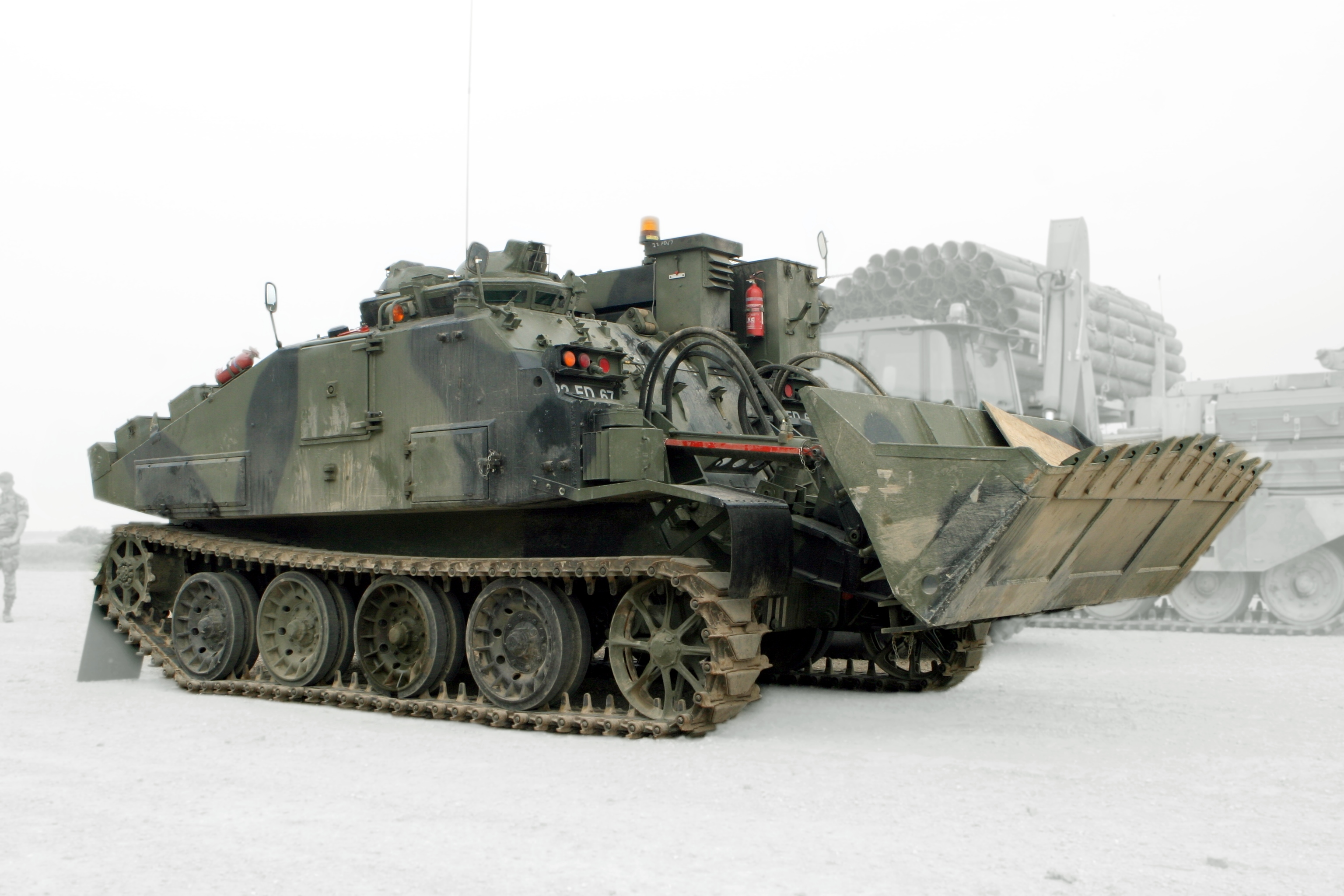
- A FV180 Combat Engineer Tractor with its back facing towards the camera
- Type: Armoured combat engineering vehicle
- Place of origin: United Kingdom

Service history
- In service: British Army, Indian Army, Singapore Army

Specifications
- Mass: 17.5 tonnes (19.3 short tons; 17.2 long tons)
- Length: 7.54 m (24 ft 9 in)
- Width: 2.94 m (9 ft 8 in)
- Height: 2.67 m (8 ft 9 in)
- Crew: 2
- Armour: Honeycombed twin skin aluminium alloy
- Main armament: None (Crew armed with personal weapons only)
- Engine: Rolls-Royce C6TFR; 320 hp (240 kW)
- Power/weight: 19 hp/tonne
- Suspension: Torsion bar
- Operational range: 480 km (300 mi)
- Maximum speed: 56 km/h (35 mph) (road); 8 knots (15 km/h; 9.2 mph) (water)

The FV180 Combat Engineer Tractor or C.E.T. is an amphibious specialist armoured vehicle formerly used by the British Army, entering production in 1977 and being replaced starting in 2013. A tracked, lightly armoured vehicle, with amphibious capability, the CET was used by Royal Engineers in ground preparation for bridge construction and towing activities in the front line of battle, such as digging vehicle fighting pits, constructing earthen barriers, repairing roads, recovery of disabled vehicles from water and other obstacles, preparing riverbanks for vehicle crossings and clearing obstacles.

== Design ==
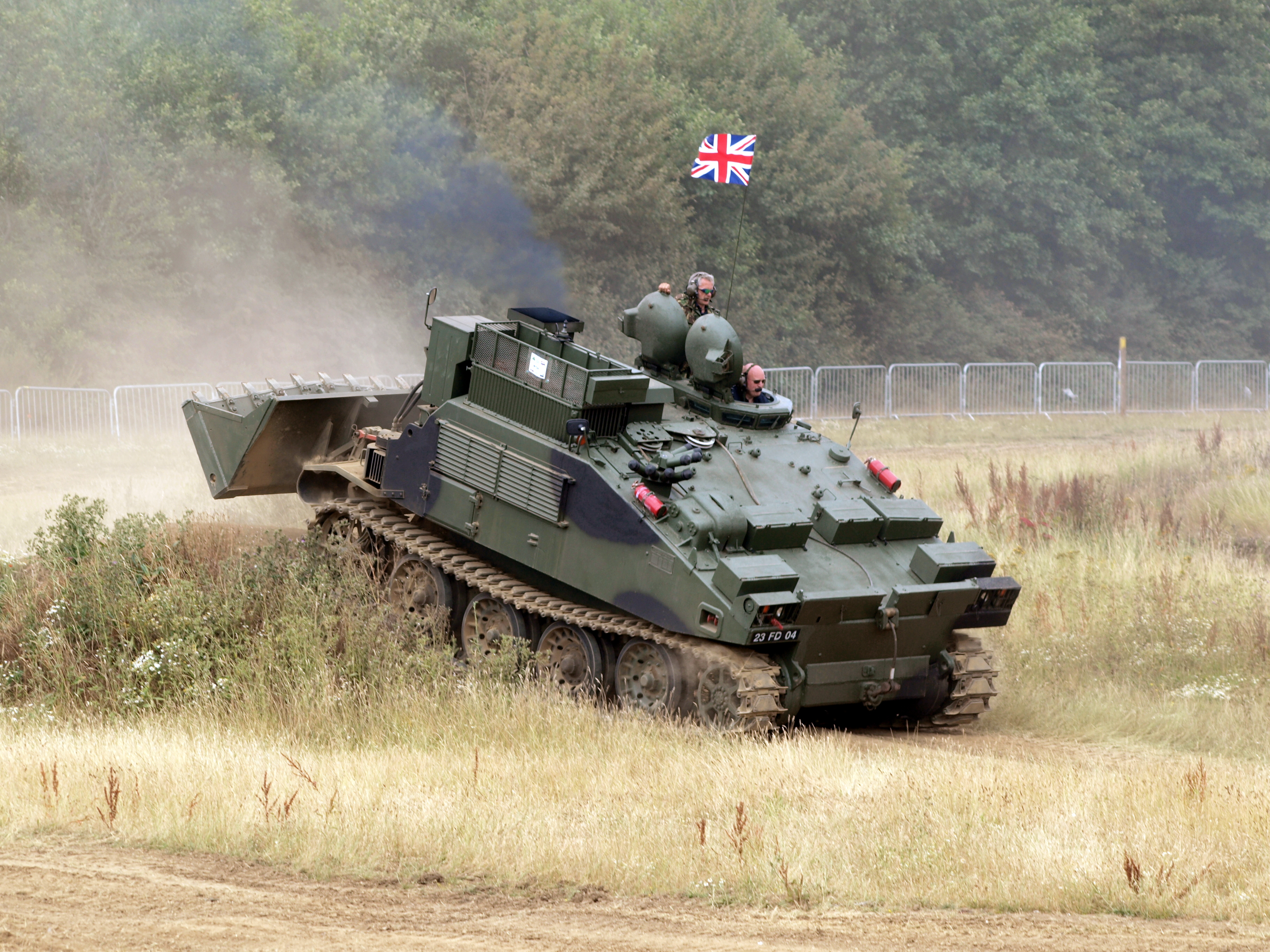
Front view

The two crew sit in tandem positions on the left hand side of the vehicle, each with a set of driving controls facing opposite directions. A large earthmoving bucket is fitted at the rear of the vehicle and a rocket-propelled anchor on a 100m hawser attached to an 8 tonne winch can be fitted to the front. When operated from the rear seat the bucket is used for earth moving; clearing obstacles, paths or digging tank or gun pits and anti-tank ditches. When operated from the front-facing seat it can be driven on the road, and the anchor can be used to pull the CET up steep obstacles such as riverbanks. The winch rope can be deployed to the front or the rear of the vehicle with a maximum pull of 8 tonnes in both configurations.

The vehicle is NBC (Nuclear, Biological and Chemical) proofed and has an air filtration unit, supplying clean air to the crew when operating with the crew hatches closed down in a contaminated environment. The NBC air system is also used to inflate the buoyancy aids required to trim the vehicle when swimming.

An Auxiliary Lifting Attachment (ALA) - a davit with a winch rope roller - fitted to the inside of the earthmoving bucket was used for lifting loads of up to 4tonnes. Loads such as Medium Girder Bridge pallets could be lifted vertically to a height of 1.8m. This then allowed a cargo vehicle to back under the suspended load, the CET could not travel or turn with a suspended load on the ALA due to lateral weakness of the ALA and the proximity of the load to the earthmoving bucket. Use of the ALA was discontinued in the 1990s due to difficulties in annual testing of the safe working load, and a reduced requirement for its use.

The amphibious propulsion is provided by two Dowty water impellers, one mounted on each side of the vehicle and controlled by the commander in the rear seat facing forwards. The water jets are used to steer the vehicle when swimming, this is with the use of movable cowls directing the flow of water. When not in use, the propulsion unit water intakes are closed off with armoured covers to prevent damage during digging operations. Flotation aids are required to trim the vehicle for swimming and a "wash board" is fitted to the front of the vehicle to prevent the bow wave flooding the crew compartment when entering water. Maximum speed in water is 8.5 knots, the vehicle will wade in 1.8m of water and requires preparation for operating in deeper water than this as it achieves buoyancy. FV180 can tow a "Giant Viper" anti-mine system. It can be airlifted by a C-130 Hercules aircraft.

== History ==
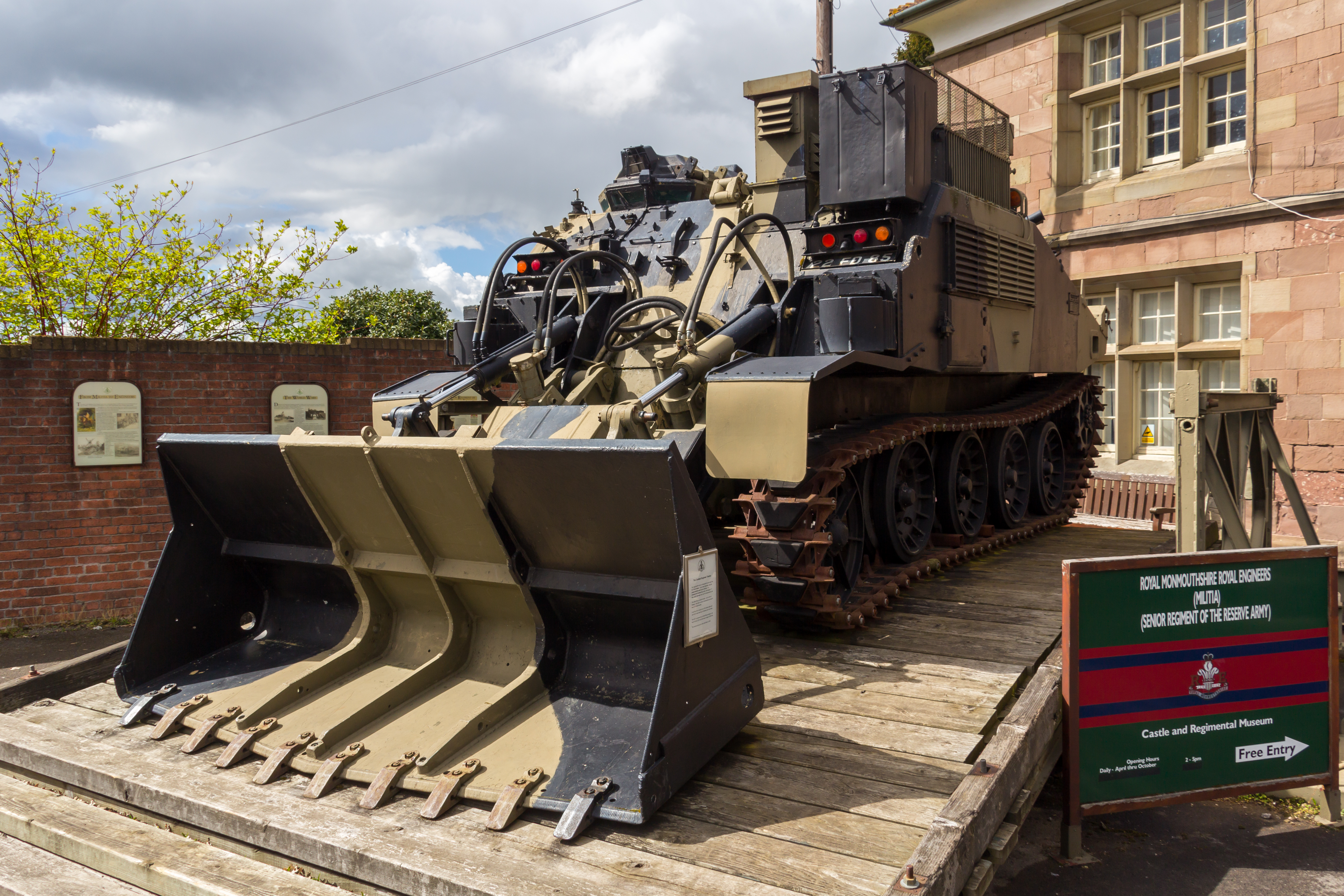
FV180 at Monmouth Regimental Museum

In 2013 the CET was replaced in British service by a new, larger vehicle: the 30 tonne Terrier armoured digger. This is better protected, equipped with night vision and can be remotely operated if required in more hazardous circumstances.

== Operators ==
=== Current operators ===
- India
- Singapore
- Ukraine

=== Former operators ===
- United Kingdom
