= Denys Dykyi =

Ukrainian soldier

Hero of Ukraine Denys Dykyi
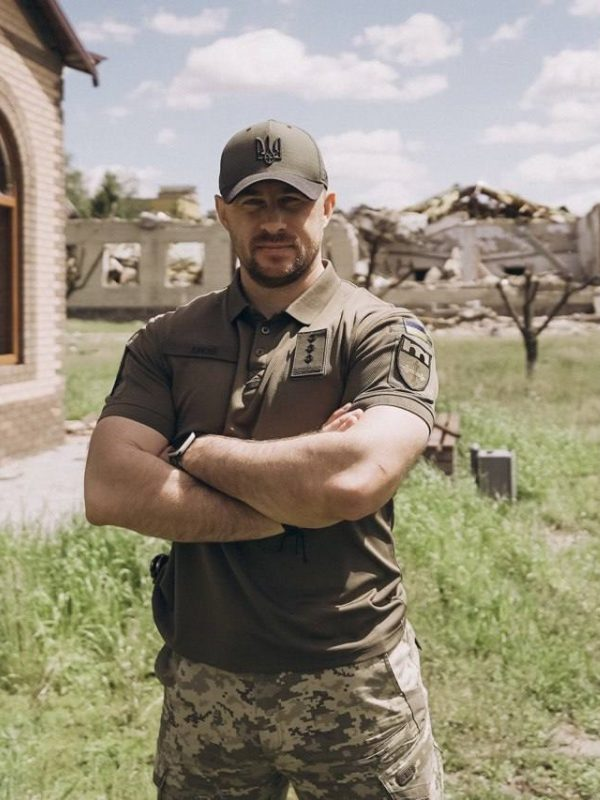
- Born: Denys Leonidovych Dykyi; 14 October 1980 (age 46); Altai Krai
- Education: National Defense University of Ukraine
- Military career
- Allegiance: Ukraine
- Branch: Ukrainian Ground Forces
- Service years: 2002–present
- Rank: Colonel
- Conflicts: Russo-Ukrainian War; Russian invasion of Ukraine
- Awards: Order of the Gold Star Order for Courage Defender of the Motherland Medal

Denys Leonidovych Dykyi (Ukrainian: Денис Леонідович Дикий; born October 14, 1980, Altai Krai) is a Ukrainian military officer, colonel, and commander of the 91st Separate Operational Support Regiment of the Armed Forces of Ukraine. He is a participant in the Russian-Ukrainian war. He was awarded the title of Hero of Ukraine in 2022.

== Biography ==
Denys Dykyi was born on October 14, 1980, in Altai Krai, into a military family. His father was an officer in the engineering forces and retired with the rank of colonel.

In 2002, he graduated from the Kamyanets-Podilsky Military Engineering Institute with a specialization in "Application of Units and Connections of Engineering Forces."

In 2010, he enrolled in the Ivan Chernyakhovsky National Defense University of Ukraine, where he obtained a master's degree in "Application of Units and Connections of Operational-Tactical Level of Engineering Forces." He completed his studies in 2012, receiving a gold medal and being awarded the Bohdan Khmelnytsky Saber.

Starting from 2002, he served in the military unit A0563, holding positions from platoon commander to battalion staff chief. In 2012, he became the deputy commander of the A0563 unit responsible for armaments. On August 21, 2018, he assumed command of the unit.

In 2014, while performing a task in Starohnativka near Volnovakha, his unit fell into an ambush near Hranitne. At that time, he served as the deputy commander of the regiment responsible for armaments. The sappers were on a mission to blow up a bridge when they were ambushed, and the enemy destroyed their equipment. Denys saved lives by rescuing the wounded under gunfire and fighting his way out.

== Awards ==
- Hero of Ukraine with the presentation of the Order of the Golden Star (March 2, 2022) for personal bravery and heroism demonstrated in defense of the state sovereignty and territorial integrity of Ukraine, and loyalty to the military oath.
- Order of Courage, 3rd Class (December 5, 2017) for personal contribution to strengthening the defense capability of the Ukrainian state, courage, and selfless actions demonstrated in defense of the state sovereignty and territorial integrity of Ukraine, and exemplary performance of military duty.
- Medal "For the Defender of the Homeland" (January 6, 2016) for personal bravery and high professionalism demonstrated in defense of the state sovereignty and territorial integrity of Ukraine, and loyalty to the military oath.
- Honorary citizen of Ohtyrka (2022).
