= Ivanivka, Okhtyrka Raion, Sumy Oblast =

Village in Ukraine

Ivanivka Іванівка
- Village
- Location within Sumy Oblast Location within Ukraine
- Coordinates: 50°22′07″N 35°09′15″E
- Country: Ukraine
- Oblast: Sumy Oblast
- Raion: Okhtyrka Raion
- Founded: 1503

Population
  - Total: 1,503
- Time zone: UTC+2 (EET)
  - Summer (DST): UTC+3 (EEST)
- Postal Code: 42839

Ivanivka (Ukrainian: Іванівка), is a village in northeastern Ukraine, located in Okhtyrka Raion of Sumy Oblast.

== History ==
According to a census of the Russian Empire in 1864, the village had a population of 440, including 225 men and 235 women.

Like many other villages throughout Ukraine, the population suffered through the Holodomor in 1932-1933, with many dying from starvation.

This is the birthplace of famous painter Alexander Bogomazov.
