= Area denial weapon =

Weapon device for preventing occupation or traversing of a specified location

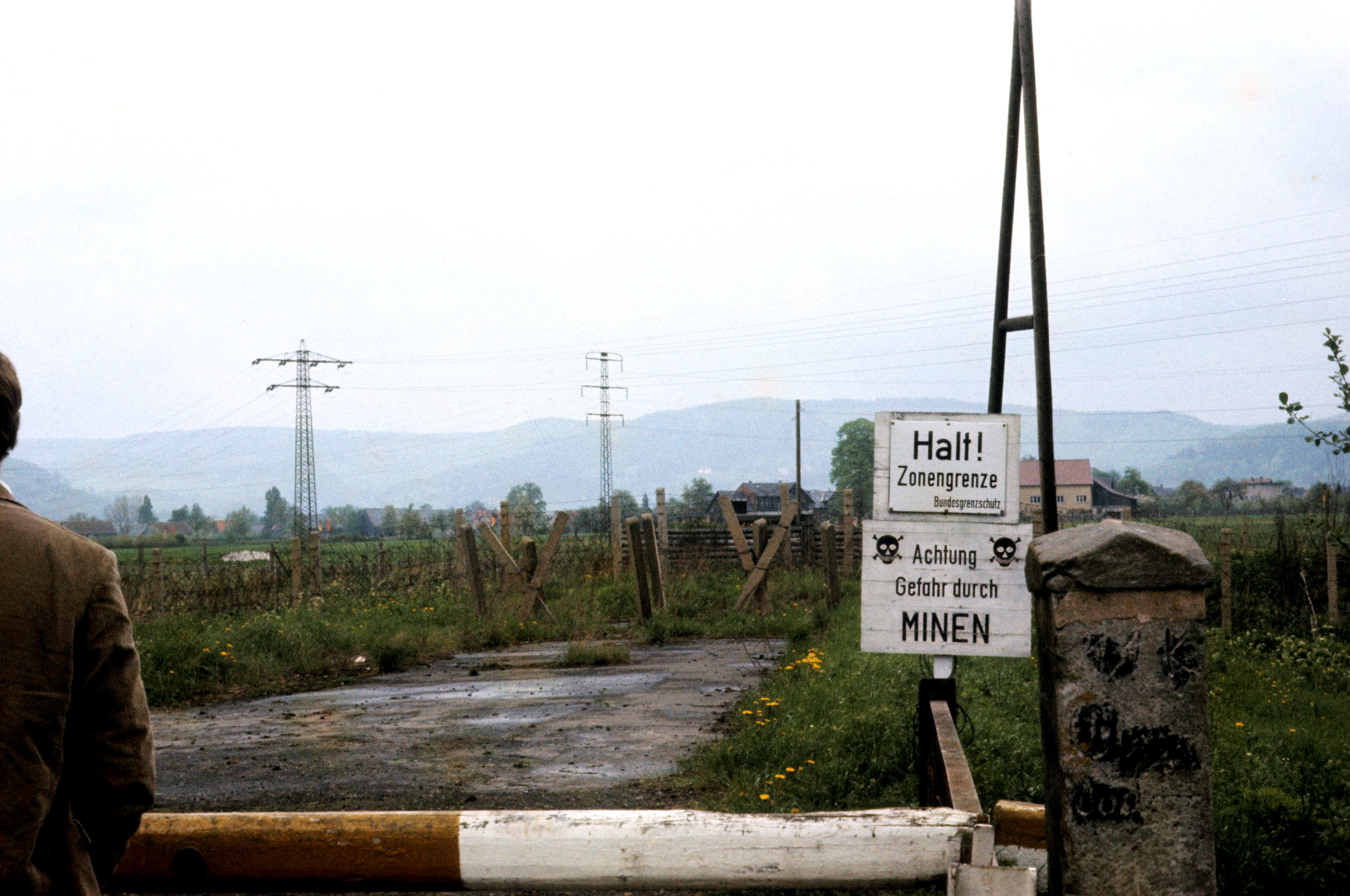
Minefield at East–West Germany Border in 1965

An area denial weapon is a war offensive and defensive device used to prevent an adversary from occupying or traversing an area of land, sea or air. The specific method may not be totally effective in preventing passage, but is sufficient to severely restrict, slow down, or endanger the opponent. Some area denial weapons pose risks to civilians entering the area even long after combat has ended, and consequently are often controversial. An area denial weapon can be part of an anti-access/area denial (A2/AD) strategy.

== Historical methods ==
=== Anti-cavalry ===
In medieval warfare, sturdy stakes were stuck into the ground at the bottom of long lines of ditches, positioned with a sharp end pointing up diagonally, in order to prevent cavalry charges in a given area. Even if the stakes were spotted, horsemen would be forced to dismount and effectively give up their advantage as cavalry, and become easier targets. The correct layout of these extensive lines of ditches and the control of stake size, form and placement were part of the craft of war.

An alternative cavalry deterrent, allowing quicker dispersal and providing the advantage of being hidden more easily, was the deployment of, for example, small balls with spikes, used during most of antiquity. Many variants were used, such as boards with metal hooks, as described as used by Julius Caesar. A more modern version of this are caltrops. Passive fortification—ditches and obstacles such as dragon's teeth and Czech hedgehogs—were used as anti-tank measures during World War II.

=== Anti-infantry ===
Simple rows or clusters of sharpened sticks (nowadays also known as punji sticks), and small caltrops have been used in anti-infantry warfare since antiquity. However, due to the difficulty of mass-producing them in the pre-modern age, they were rarely used except in the defense of limited areas or chokepoints, especially during sieges, where they were used to help seal breaches. Increasing ease of production still did not prevent these methods from slowly falling out of favor from the late Middle Ages onward.

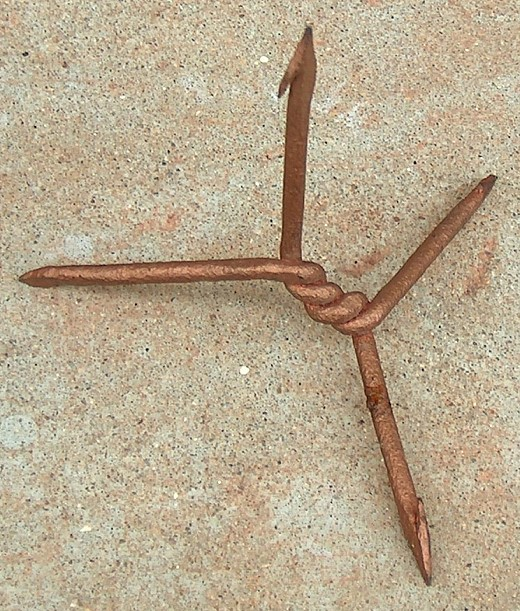
Caltrop used in Vietnam, 1968

Caltrops are still sometimes used in modern conflicts, such as during the Korean War, where Chinese troops, often wearing only light shoes, were particularly vulnerable. In modern times, special caltrops are also sometimes used against wheeled vehicles with pneumatic tires. Some South American urban guerrillas such as the Tupamaros and Montoneros, who called them "miguelitos," have used caltrops to avoid pursuit after ambushes.

== Modern methods ==
=== Explosives ===
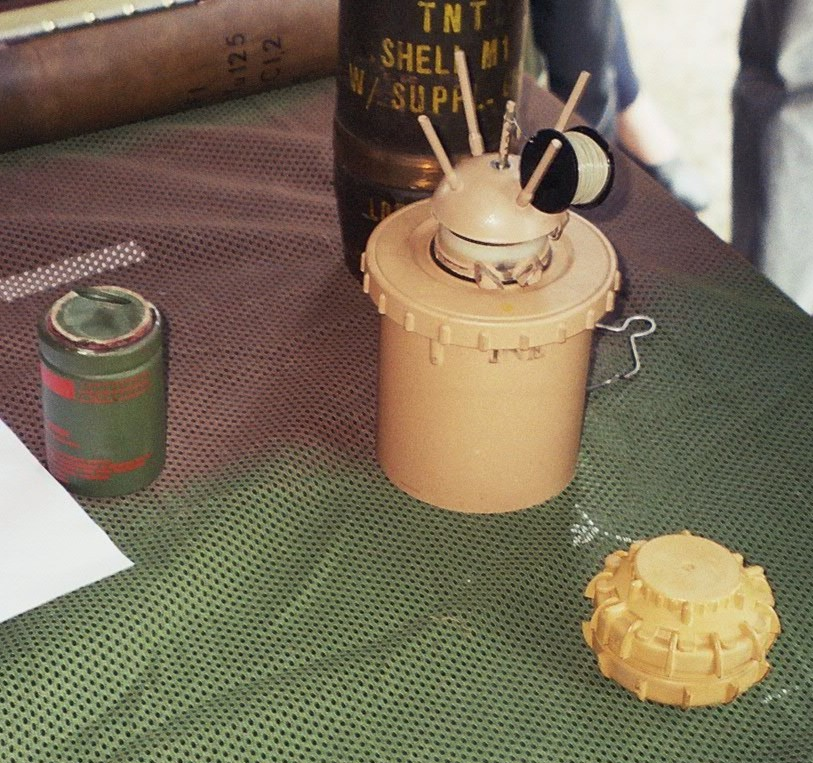
Anti-personnel landmines

The most common area denial weapons are land mines of various types, planted by hand or dispersed by artillery. Some modern prototypes experiment with automatic guns or artillery-delivered ammunitions that are fired only after remote sensing detects enemies.

Booby traps or improvised explosive devices in sufficient concentration also qualify as area denial weapons, though they are much easier to clear and usually pose less long-term danger. Temporary area denial can be achieved on a tactical level by artillery barrage.

During an armed conflict there are several methods of countering land mines. These include using armored vehicles to negate the effects of anti-personnel land mines. Land mines can also be cleared either by hand, or by using specialised equipment such as tanks equipped with flails. Explosives can also be used to clear mine fields, either by artillery bombardment, or with specialised charges such as Bangalore torpedoes, the anti-personnel obstacle breaching system and the Python minefield breaching system.

156 states are parties to the Ottawa Treaty under which they have agreed not to use, stockpile, produce or transfer anti-personnel mines.

=== CBRNE agents ===
Various CBRNE (chemical, biological, radiological, nuclear, and explosive) weapons can be used for area denial, as long as the agent is long-lasting. Fallout from nuclear weapons might be used in such a role. While never actually employed in this form, its use had been suggested by Douglas MacArthur during the Korean War, who proposed spreading radioactive waste across transportation corridors to inhibit the movement of Chinese and North Korean forces.

Anthrax spores can contaminate the ground for long periods of time, thus providing a form of area denial. However, the short-term (tactical) effects are likely to be low - the psychological effects on an opponent would likely be more significant.

The massive use of defoliants such as Agent Orange can be used as an interdiction measure because they leave areas empty of any form of vegetation cover. In the desert-like terrain that ensues, it is impossible for the enemy to travel without being seen, and there is little cover in case of an attack, especially from the air.

Many chemical weapons also produce toxic effects on any personnel in an affected area. However, this usually has no tactical value, as the effects of indirect exposure do not develop fast or substantially enough - though again, the psychological effect upon an enemy aware of the chemical usage may be considerable. There are however some chemical agents that are by design non-degrading, such as the nerve agent VX. Sulfur mustard (mustard gas) was extensively used by both German and allied forces on the west front in World War I as an effective area-denial weapon, usually through contaminating large land stripes by extensive shelling with chemical ordnance. Since sulfur mustard is very persistent, involatile, hard-to-decontaminate and highly effective in inflicting debilitating casualties at even low doses, this tactic proved to be very effective.

=== Targeted ===
To address some of the problems with land-mines (see § Drawbacks), weapons manufacturers are now experimenting with area-denial weapons which need human command to operate. Such systems are usually envisioned as a combination of either explosives, pre-targeted artillery shelling or smartguns with remote sensing equipment (sound, vibration, sight/thermal). By not posing a long-term risk, and by having some level of IFF capability (automatic or human-decision-based), these systems aim to achieve compliance with the Ottawa Treaty, as for example the Metal Storm ADWS (Area Denial Weapons System).

== Drawbacks ==
As area denial weapons do not discriminate between friend, foe, or civilian, they make the affected zone hazardous for all trying to enter. Concepts for area denial weapons which do discriminate (by active sensing) have often been proposed, but have not yet reached a stage of general usefulness, due to their high complexity (and cost) and the risk of misidentification.

Explosive-based area-denial weapons (mines) may be intentionally equipped with detonators which degrade over time, either exploding them or rendering them relatively harmless. Even in these cases, unexploded munitions often pose significant risk.

== See also ==
- Active Denial System
- Anti-access/area denial
- Area Denial Artillery Munition
- Decontamination foam
- Denied area
- Scorched earth
- Sea denial
- Sentry gun
- Suppressive fire
