= UR-77 Meteorit =

Soviet/Russian mine clearing vehicle

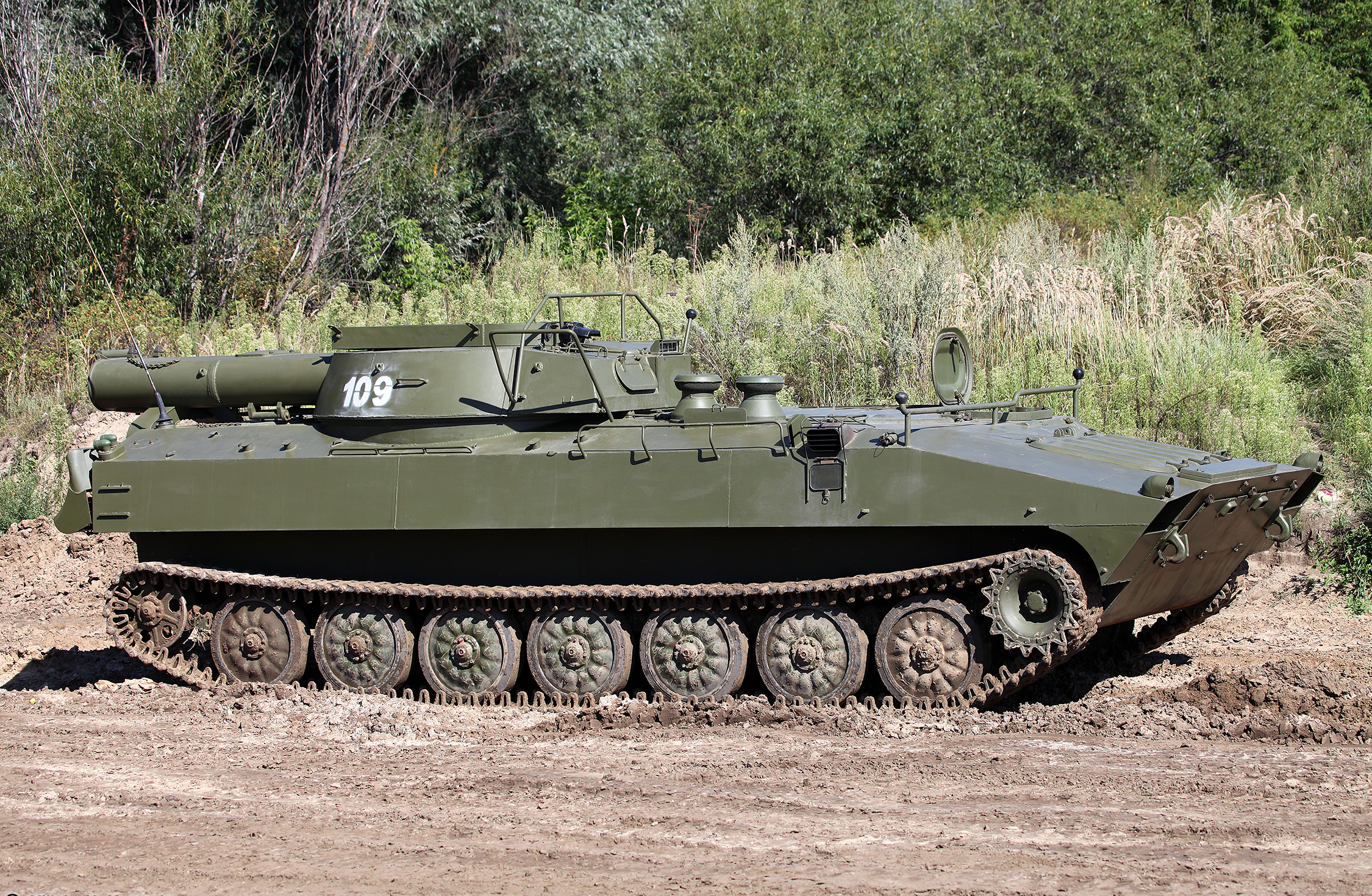
- Type: Mine clearing vehicle
- Place of origin: Soviet Union

Service history
- In service: 1978–present
- Used by: Russia; Syria; Ukraine
- Wars: First Chechen War; Second Chechen War; Russo-Ukrainian War; Second Battle of Donetsk Airport; Syrian Civil War; Russian invasion of Ukraine

Production history
- Designed: 1977
- Manufacturer: Kharkiv Traktor Plant Soviet Union
- Produced: 1978
- No. built: 550

Specifications
- Mass: 15,500 kg (34,200 lb)
- Crew: 2
- Effective firing range: 90 m (300 ft)
- Main armament: Mine-clearing line charge

The UR-77 Meteorit (Russian: УР-77 «Метеорит», lit. 'Meteorite') is a Soviet mine clearing vehicle, based on a variant of the tracked 2S1 Gvozdika chassis.

== Description ==
The vehicle is armed with a launcher and two mine-clearing line charges. When launched, a rocket deploys a line charge by extending it out into a line that crosses the minefield. When detonated, the charge causes a shock wave that destroys or disables all the shells or mines in an area along the line charge with a width of 6 metres and length up to 90 metres. Thus a break in the minefield is created.

The vehicle has also been used offensively in Syria, where its line charge has been used to destroy entire streets in urban combat, and by the Russians and Ukrainians in Ukraine.

== Current operators ==
- Azerbaijan
- Syria
- Russia
- Transnistria
- Ukraine

== Similar systems ==
- Giant Viper
- Python minefield breaching system
