= M1150 assault breacher vehicle =

M1150 Assault Breacher Vehicle
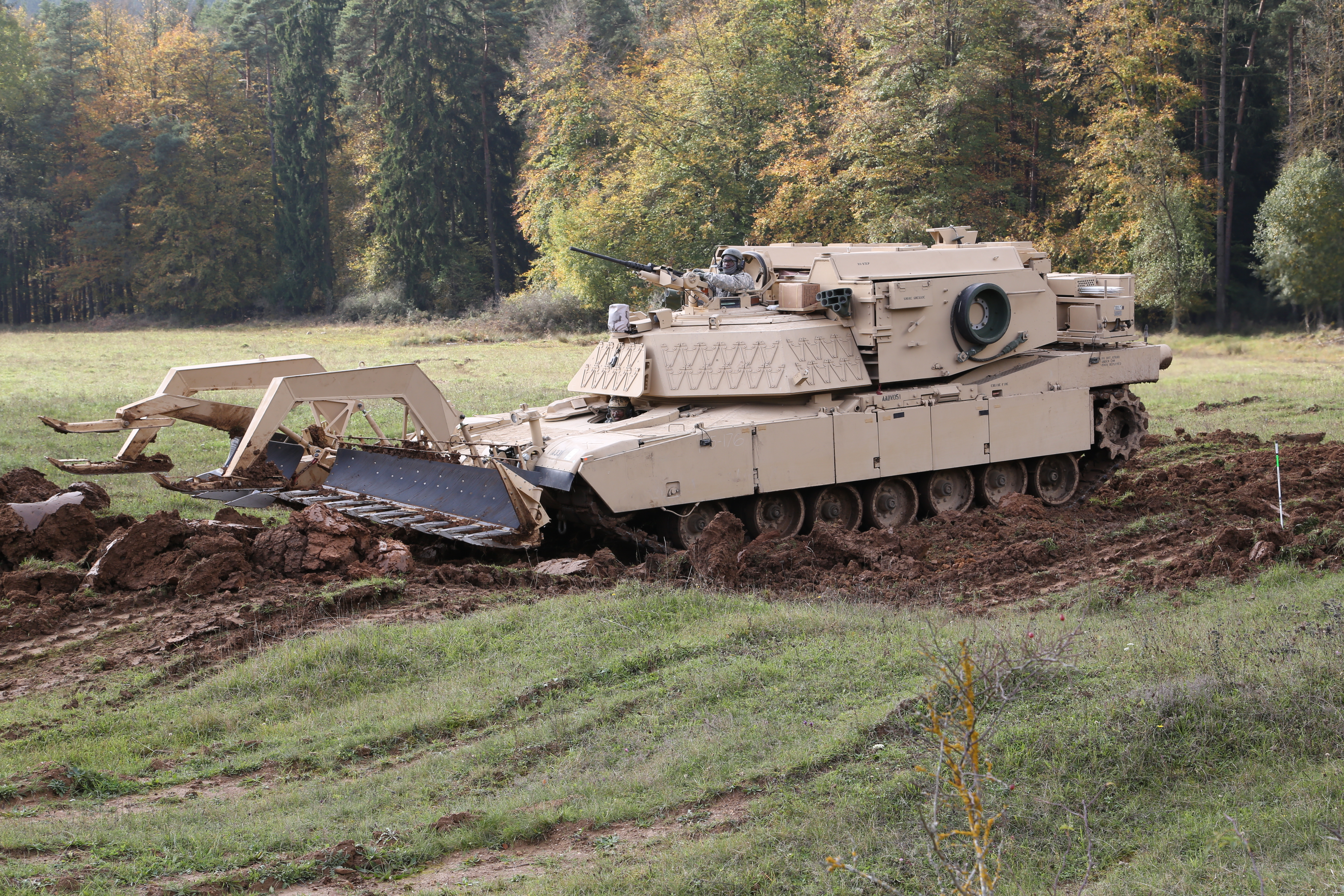
- A US Army M1150 Assault Breacher Vehicle during an exercise in 2014
- Type: Military engineering vehicle
- Place of origin: United States

Service history
- In service: 2009–present
- Used by: United States Army; United States Marine Corps (2009–c. 2023) Australian Army (2025-present); Armed Forces of Ukraine
- Wars: War in Afghanistan; Russo-Ukrainian war; Russian invasion of Ukraine

Production history
- Unit cost: $14 million (FY 2009)
- No. built: 239

Specifications
- Length: 40 feet (12 meters)
- Crew: 2
- Main armament: M58 MICLIC
- Secondary armament: 1 .50 BMG M2 machine gun mount on top of the vehicle.

The M1150 Assault Breacher Vehicle (ABV) is a U.S. military mine- and explosives-clearing vehicle, based on the M1 Abrams chassis, equipped with a mine plow and line charges. Its first large scale use by the US Marines (USMC) was in the joint ISAF-Afghan Operation Moshtarak in Southern Afghanistan during the War in Afghanistan in 2010 against the Taliban insurgency.

The USMC had retired the ABV as of 2023.

== Design and purpose ==
These tracked combat vehicles were specifically designed to clear pathways for troops and other vehicles through minefields and along roadside bombs and improvised explosive devices. The 72-ton, 40-foot-long (12 m) vehicles are based on the M1 Abrams with a 1,500 horsepower engine, but fitted with only a .50 cal machine gun and a front-mounted 15-foot-wide (4.6 m) plow, supported by metallic skis that glide on the dirt and armed with nearly 7,000 pounds (3,200 kg) of explosives.

They are equipped with linear demolition charge system (LDCS): rockets carrying C-4 explosives up to 100–150 yards forward, detonating hidden explosives at a safe distance, so that troops and vehicles can pass through safely.

In the 1990s, the U.S. Army decided it could not afford to continue developing complicated, maintenance-heavy vehicles for this purpose. The Grizzly program was cancelled in 2001, and the prototype developed never made it to the production lines. The Marine Corps however persisted and funded its own development and testing. The main body of the final model of the ABV is built on the General Dynamics chassis that is used for the M1A1 Abrams main battle tank. Pearson Engineering of the UK provided the specially designed plow and the other mine-clearing accessories.

== Operational history ==
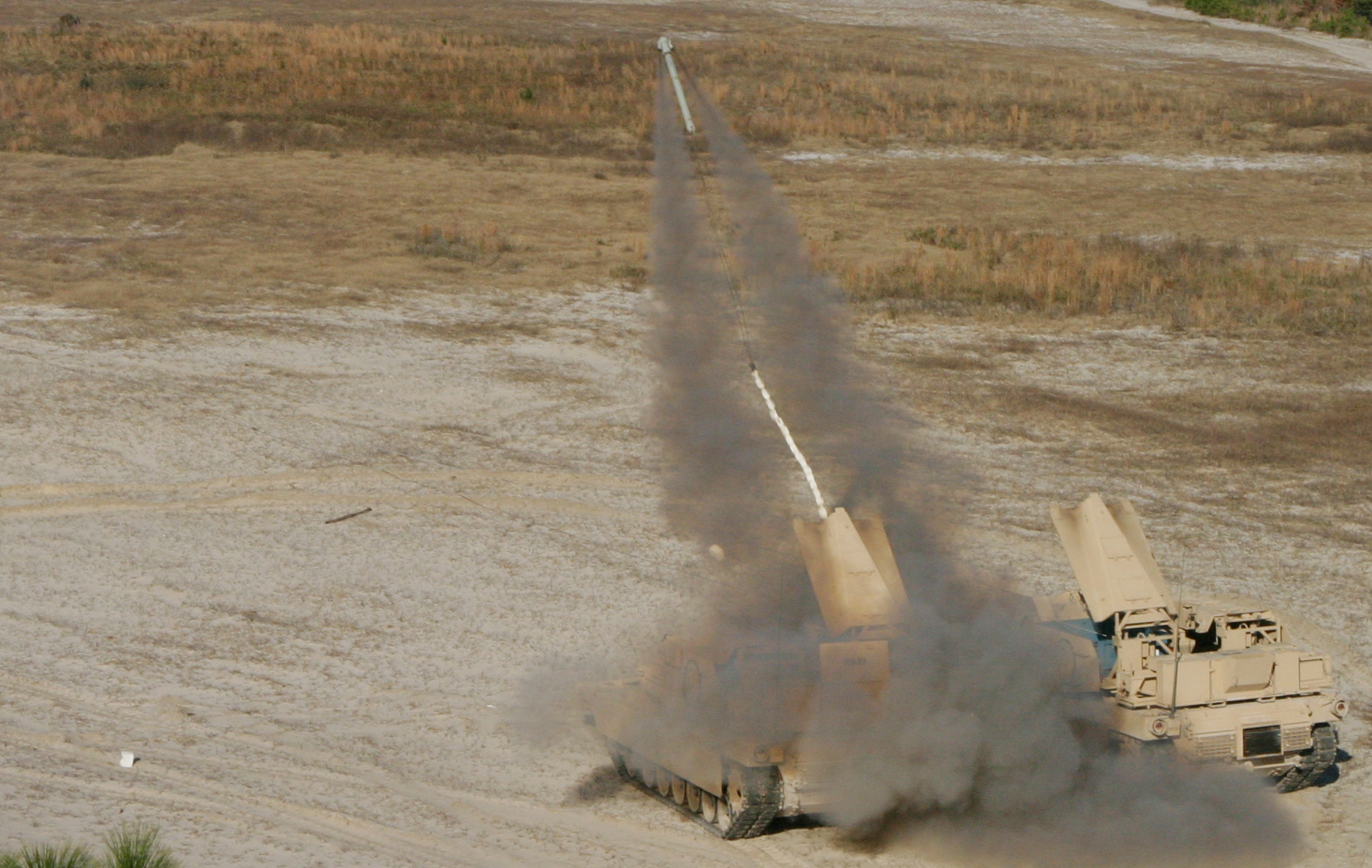
Marines with 2nd Combat Engineer Battalion launch a line charge from an assault breacher vehicle.

In the morning of December 3, 2009, for the first time breachers were used in combat, when Marines pushed into the Taliban stronghold Nawzad during Operation Cobra's Anger in Helmand province, on their way to another Taliban stronghold Marjah, 380 miles (610 kilometers) southwest of Kabul, that was to be assaulted in February 2010.

On February 11, 2010, two breachers fired explosive line charges in the desert outside Sistani to test Taliban defenses on the eve of Operation Moshtarak when closing off the enemy's escape route.

On February 13, 2010, on the first day of the operation, breachers of the US Marines 2nd Combat Engineer Battalion succeeded in digging and blasting "safety lanes" through the numerous minefields laid by the Taliban around Marjah.

According to a report in December 2009, there were then five ABVs in Afghanistan, and the U.S. Marines were said to have plans to field a total of 52 by 2012, of which about 34 have already had been produced. The U.S. Army was said to have ordered 187.

By August 2013, six ABVs were brought to the Korean Peninsula to be used by the 2nd Infantry Division (2ID) to provide the capability for deliberate and in-stride breaching of mine fields and complex obstacles. The ABVs would allow the 2ID to clear the heavily mined Korean Demilitarized Zone, believed to contain tens of thousands to millions of mines. A previous deployment of MRAP mine-resistant vehicles to South Korea caused North Korea to accuse their presence as vehicles that would cross the DMZ for an attack of the country; the MRAPs were later withdrawn due to their unsuitability for the terrain. North Korea has not publicly responded to the ABVs' arrival on the peninsula.

In 2019, the USMC's Force Design 2030 decision to divest of its Armor component included the ABV. This divestment transferred the majority their ABV inventory to the Army. This action resulted in the US Army being the sole branch of the US Military with under-armor mechanical breach capability. As of 2023, the USMC had divested the ABV.

In April 2021 the US Department of State approved the sale of 29 M1150s to Australia, where they will be operated by the Australian Army.

=== Russo-Ukrainian War ===
==== Russian invasion of Ukraine ====
In November 2023 an ABV was shown in Ukraine during a ceremony to commemorate Ukraine's Day of Rocket Forces and Artillery and Engineering Troops Day.

On February 22, 2024 an M1150 was lost in combat for the first time in Avdiivka, Ukraine. On 3 March, another M1150 was visually confirmed lost in combat near the village of Berdychi, Avdiivka.

== Operators ==
=== Current operators ===
- United States: United States Army, 149 M1150 vehicles.
- Ukraine: Vehicles supplied by the United States.

=== Future operators ===
- Australia: 29 M1150 vehicles.
- Poland: 25 M1150 for the 18th Mechanized Division.
- Romania: 4 M1150 vehicles.
- Bahrain: 8 M1150 vehicles

=== Former operators ===
- United States: United States Marine Corps, retired in 2023.

== See also ==
- Military engineering vehicles
- Combat engineering
- Trojan armoured engineer vehicle – similar British engineering vehicle
