= Armoured Vehicle Royal Engineers =

Series of armored military engineering vehicles

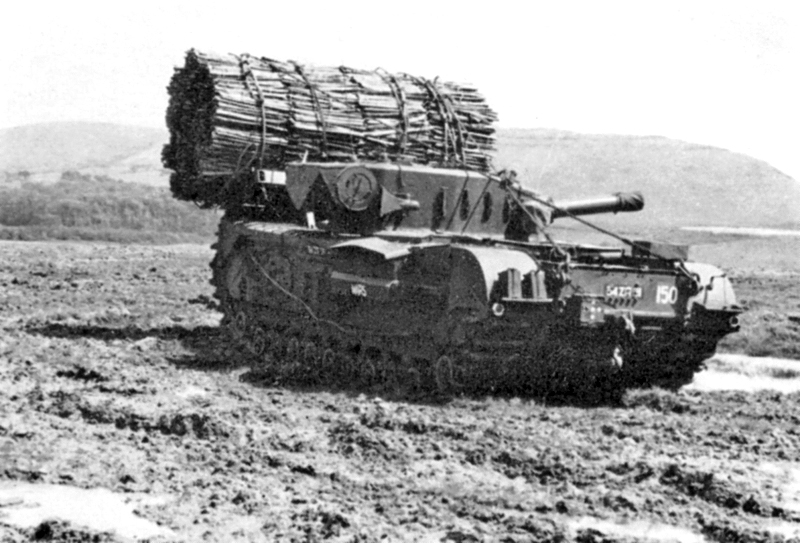
A Churchill AVRE with fascine on a tilt-forward cradle. This particular example is a post-WW2 AVRE on the MK VII chassis

Armoured Vehicle Royal Engineers (AVRE), also known as Assault Vehicle Royal Engineers, is the title given to a series of armoured military engineering vehicles operated by the Royal Engineers (RE) for the purpose of protecting engineers during frontline battlefield operations.

In protecting engineers, the vehicles also became a mobile platform for a variety of engineering purposes, mounting large calibre weapons for demolition, carrying engineering stores, mine clearance explosives, a variety of deployable roadways, and modified engineering bridges for gaps that the related Armoured Ramp Carrier ("ARK") vehicles could not overcome.

== Development history ==
Extremely high casualty rates among engineers was one of the primary reasons for the failure of the Dieppe raid of August 1942. Engineers were tasked with getting the tanks off the beach, destroying obstacles and building ramps. In the assault, the engineers were prone to gunfire while setting charges, and became a priority target for the defending forces. Those that did make it to the point where ramps could be built had lost much of their supplies on sunken landing craft. With tanks unable to leave the beaches, the raid stalled and failed.

Following failure of the raid, a Royal Canadian Engineer officer, Lt J.J. Denovan who was attached to the Department of Tank Design, proposed a vehicle to protect engineers during assault operations. Development commenced based on the experiences at Dieppe. Experiments used Churchill, Sherman and Ram tanks. The side door became a critical component for the new vehicle, allowing engineers to exit the vehicle under protection, and retreat back inside while blasting. In October 1942 a prototype based on the Churchill tank was ordered. The Churchill proved ideal, having a large amount of space inside for demolition stores, and side exit doors. The interior munition storage was removed, as was the turret basket and co-driver's seat, replaced with stowage. This provided space for 36 cu. ft. of demolition supplies and tools.

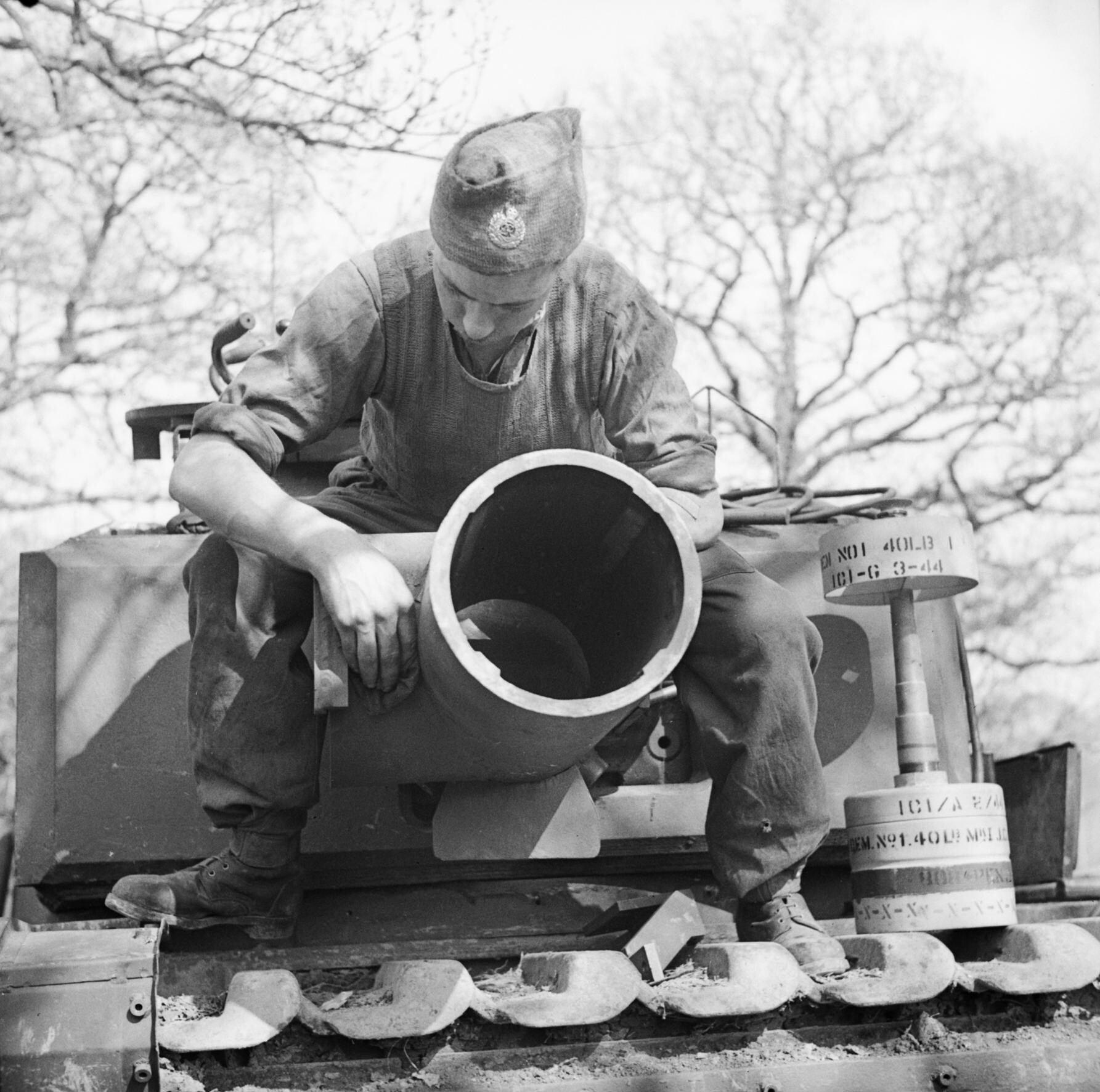
AVRE 230 mm petard mortar and its ammunition

The turret, initially not required, was retained allowing a spigot mortar firing a petard to be added. The petard mortar was a separate development, firing a large demolition charge, the "Bomb, Demolition Number I", that became known as the "flying dustbin". Development on this began in September 1942 and was united with the Churchill turret following experimental use on a Covenanter tank. With plenty of space inside the Churchill, a number of "flying dustbins" could be carried in addition to the demolitions stores. The petard was reloaded through a sliding cover that replaced one of the forward drivers hatches in the top of the hull.

Together the vehicle was named Assault Vehicle Royal Engineers. Trials of the new vehicle were undertaken throughout 1943. The vehicle was not known as "Armoured Vehicle Royal Engineers" at this time.

Production commenced in 1944 based on a mixed fleet of Churchill III and IV vehicles. These were assigned to three regiments of the Royal Engineers forming the new 1st Assault Brigade Royal Engineers, part of the 79th Armoured Division. The vehicles became the basis for a range of modifications and additions as part of Hobart's Funnies.

== Nomenclature ==
AVRE vehicles have been known by several different names through their lifespan.

Secrecy over the meaning of the codenames given to Hobart's Funnies in the lead-in to D-Day led many to refer to the AVRE simply as an "engineer tank", most not knowing the AVRE name or what AVRE stood for. This led to confusion with other types of engineer tank, such as recovery vehicles. In October 1943 an army training memorandum was issued removing the ambiguity in naming and defining the "Assault Vehicle Royal Engineers" name for all users.

The majority of documentation continued to refer to the abbreviated "AVRE" (or "A.Vs.R.E." in plural). Even the Churchill AVRE's own instruction book did not explain what A.V.R.E. stood for. With infrequent use of the full form, naming became confused.

At the end of the war, the Final Report of the 79th Armoured Division, the records of the Department of Tank Design, and the official history of the 1st Assault Brigade Royal Engineers, all use the "Assault Vehicle" terminology. The official history of the 79th Armoured Division states "Armoured Vehicle Royal Engineers" however, although notes that it was rushed into print. As the latter was provided to all members of the division, the "Armoured Vehicle" terminology gained significant traction.

The vehicles continue to be referred to primarily in the abbreviated "AVRE" form. When rarely defined, both the Churchill VII AVRE and the Centurion AVRE became known by both Assault and Armoured terms interchangeably, with the latter Armoured term becoming more common. Nomenclature settled on Armoured Vehicle with the introduction of the Chieftain Armoured Vehicle Royal Engineers. "Armoured Vehicle Royal Engineers" has since become the accepted term, retrospectively applied to previous vehicles in most references.

More recently, the AVRE designation appears to have been dropped from Trojan.

== Models ==
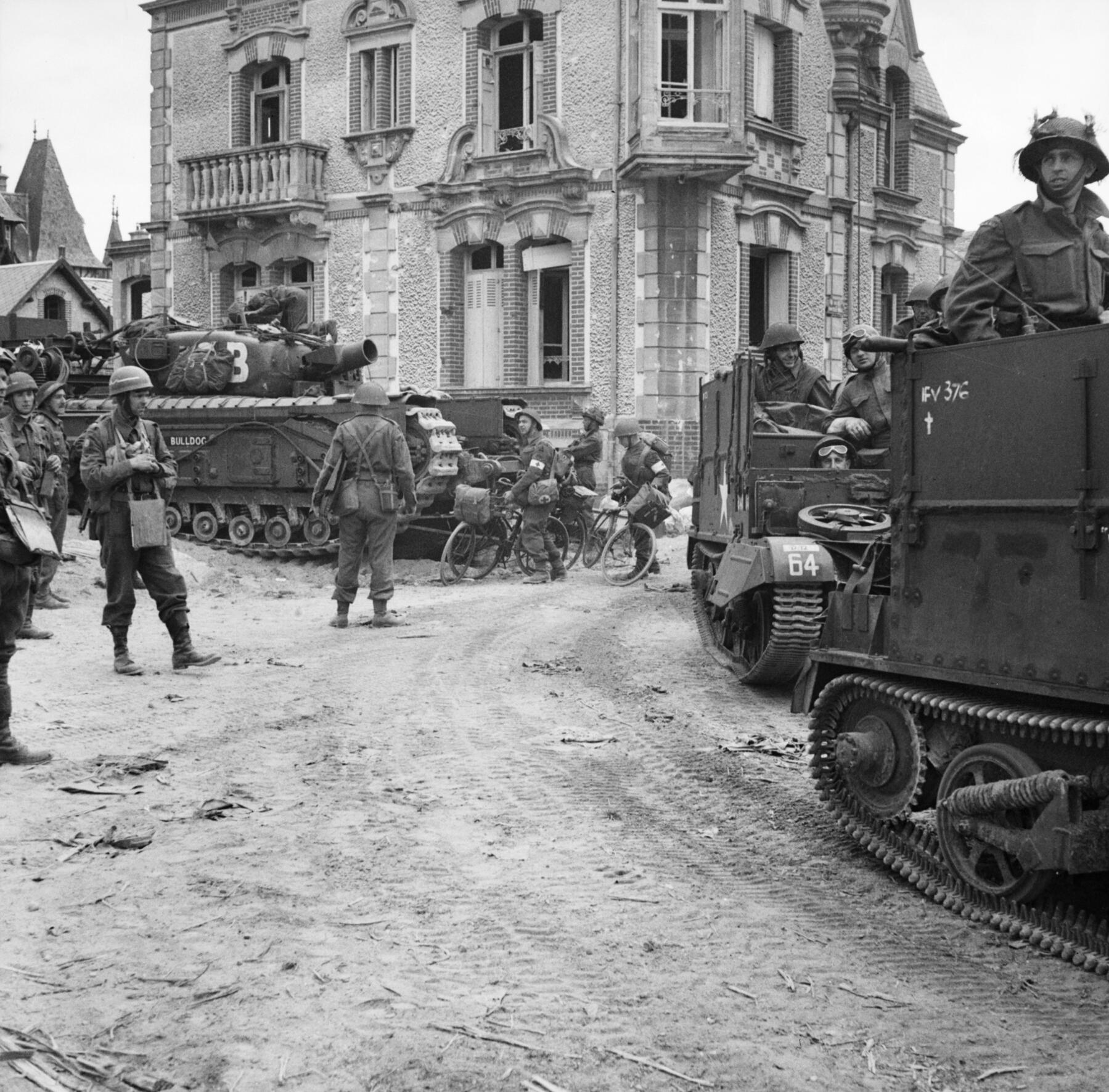
Churchill IV AVRE in France, 1944

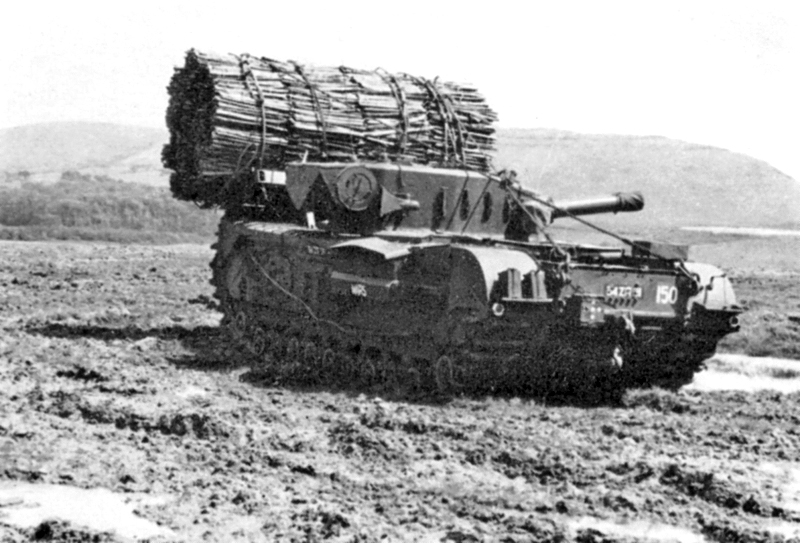
Churchill VII AVRE with fascine

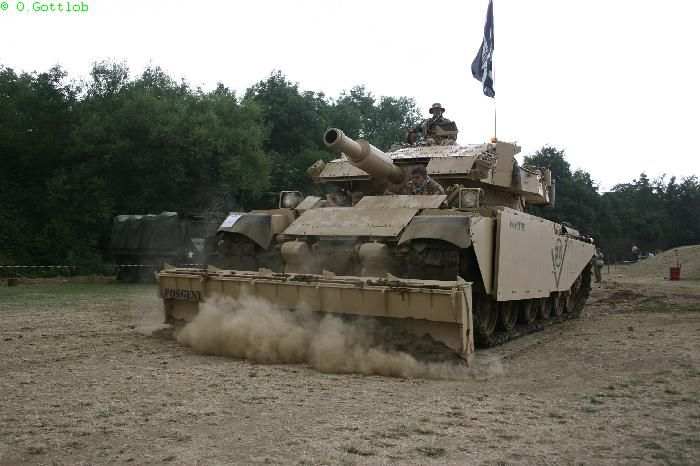
Centurion AVRE

=== Churchill III and IV AVRE ===
Churchill AVRE was a Churchill III or IV armed with a 230 mm petard spigot mortar, officially designated; Mortar, Recoiling, Spigot, 29mm, Mk I or II. (Note: This is sometimes mistakenly called a 290mm spigot mortar, likely assuming that such a large munition could never be as small as 29mm, but 29mm is in fact correct; it refers to the diameter of the spigot, not the entire round, which has a diameter of 230mm.) The mount replaced the 6-pounder gun in welded turrets on the Mark III and cast turrets on the Mark IV, otherwise the vehicles are identical. The 6-pounder gun mounting was modified, and retained the 6-pounder sights although "flying dustbin" effective range was only around 80 yd (73 m) of 230 yd (210 m) maximum.

Crew was increased to six to accommodate a demolition NCO with the driver, commander, gunner, wireless operator, and co-driver/machine gunner. Internal ammunition stowage and the co-driver / hull gunner's seat was removed to provide compartments for demolition charges. This housed stores of the "General Wade" 26 lb (12 kg) explosive charge, and "Beehive" charges of up to 75 lb (34 kg) of explosive. Both types of charge had to be set manually, but could be detonated from the relative safety of the AVRE interior. In the remaining space, compartments in the sponsons were created fore and aft of the side hatches for "flying dustbin" ammunition.

=== Churchill VII AVRE ===
Post-war, new FV3903 Churchill AVREs were created using the Churchill VII base vehicle re-armed with a short barrelled L9A1 165 mm demolition gun. This fired a 64 lb (29 kg) HESH round.

=== Centurion Mk 5 AVRE "AVRE 165" ===
FV4003 Centurion Mk 5 AVRE. Armed with a short barrelled L9A1 165 mm demolition gun, it entered service in 1963, replacing the Churchill AVRE. The vehicle was later renamed AVRE 165 relating to its primary armament. The armament was capable of firing a 60 lb (29 kg) high-explosive squash head (HESH) round.

The vehicle front added a dozer blade to the front, and frequently towed the Giant Viper for mine clearance or other trailers for stores. Large turret bins provided stowage. The dozer attachment was also provided on regular tanks as the FV4019 Centurion Mk 5 Bulldozer.

Centurion AVREs remained in use, and were up-armoured for Operation Desert Storm in 1991.

=== Centurion Mk 12 AVRE "AVRE 105" ===
FV4203 Centurion Mk 12 AVRE. A modified Artillery Observation Post vehicle, it was armed with the conventional 105 mm Royal Ordnance L7 rifled gun and provided with track width mine clearance ploughs instead of the dozer blade on the Mk 5.

=== Chieftain AEV and FV4203 Chieftain AVRE ===
Replacement of Centurion AVRE was planned to be accomplished by two new vehicles splitting the AVRE role: the Chieftain Armoured Engineering Vehicle (Gun) and Chieftain Armoured Engineering Vehicle (Winch). Both were to be multi-role vehicles capable of more than just the AVRE function.

- Chieftain AEV (Gun) was to be fitted with a demolition gun, but was cancelled early in the design process due to budget constraints.
- Chieftain AEV (Winch) continued in development and design evolved into the Chieftain ARV and two prototype gunless FV4203 Chieftain AVRE vehicles built in the early 1970s.

FV4203 AVRE vehicles were almost identical to the Chieftain ARV, also based on the AEV (Winch), but added a dozer blade/bucket, deployable bridge, and the ability to launch a roadway. The project was cancelled in favour of completing normal engineering operations with the lightly armoured Combat Engineer Tractor (CET) while retaining the Centurion AVRE in frontline service.

The FV4203 AVRE prototypes were later converted for Armoured Repair and Recovery Vehicle (ARRV) trials.

=== Chieftain "CHAVRE" AVRE ===
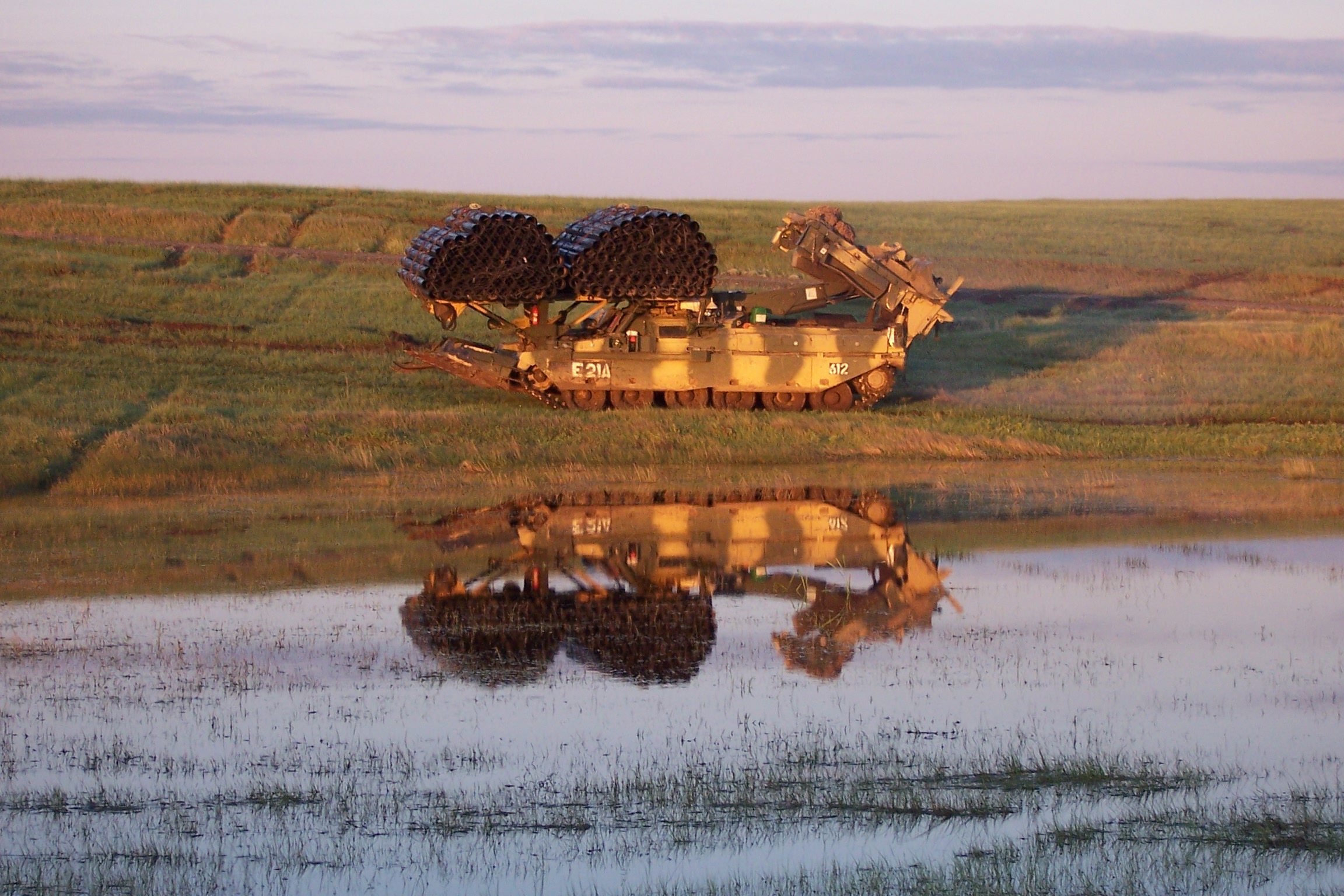
Chieftain "CHAVRE" AVRE

With the introduction of Challenger 1, the Centurion AVRE was struggling to keep up, while military requirements needed a larger number of trackways to be carried. Surplus Chieftain vehicles could have the turret removed to reduce the vehicle weight, providing enhanced mobility even when loaded with engineering stores. Removal of the turret would also allow six Class 60 trackways or three fascines to be carried on top of the vehicle.

The Chieftain tank based "Willich Chieftain AVRE" entered service in 1987. This vehicle was designed by Capt D Clegg MBE RE. Twelve vehicles were built by 32 Armoured Engineer Regiment and 21 Engineer Base Workshop of the Royal Engineers under the direction of Lt Col JF Johnson RE based in the German town of Willich, hence its name. Some of these vehicles saw use in the First Gulf War.

In 1989 a programme was launched to convert a further 48 vehicles with prototypes arriving in 1991. The Chieftain "CHAVRE" AVRE entered service in 1994. 48 units were produced by Vickers Defence Systems. The "CHAVRE" nomenclature mirrored that of the Chieftain ARRV "CHARRV" as distinguished from the Challenger ARRV "CRARRV".

Each CHAVRE provided a 10 tonne winch and Atlas crane for engineering operations, along with a trackway on top for multiple fascines or stores. It also fitted a dozer blade or mine plough.

With no primary armament, CHAVRE was initially used alongside the Centurion AVRE.

=== Trojan ===
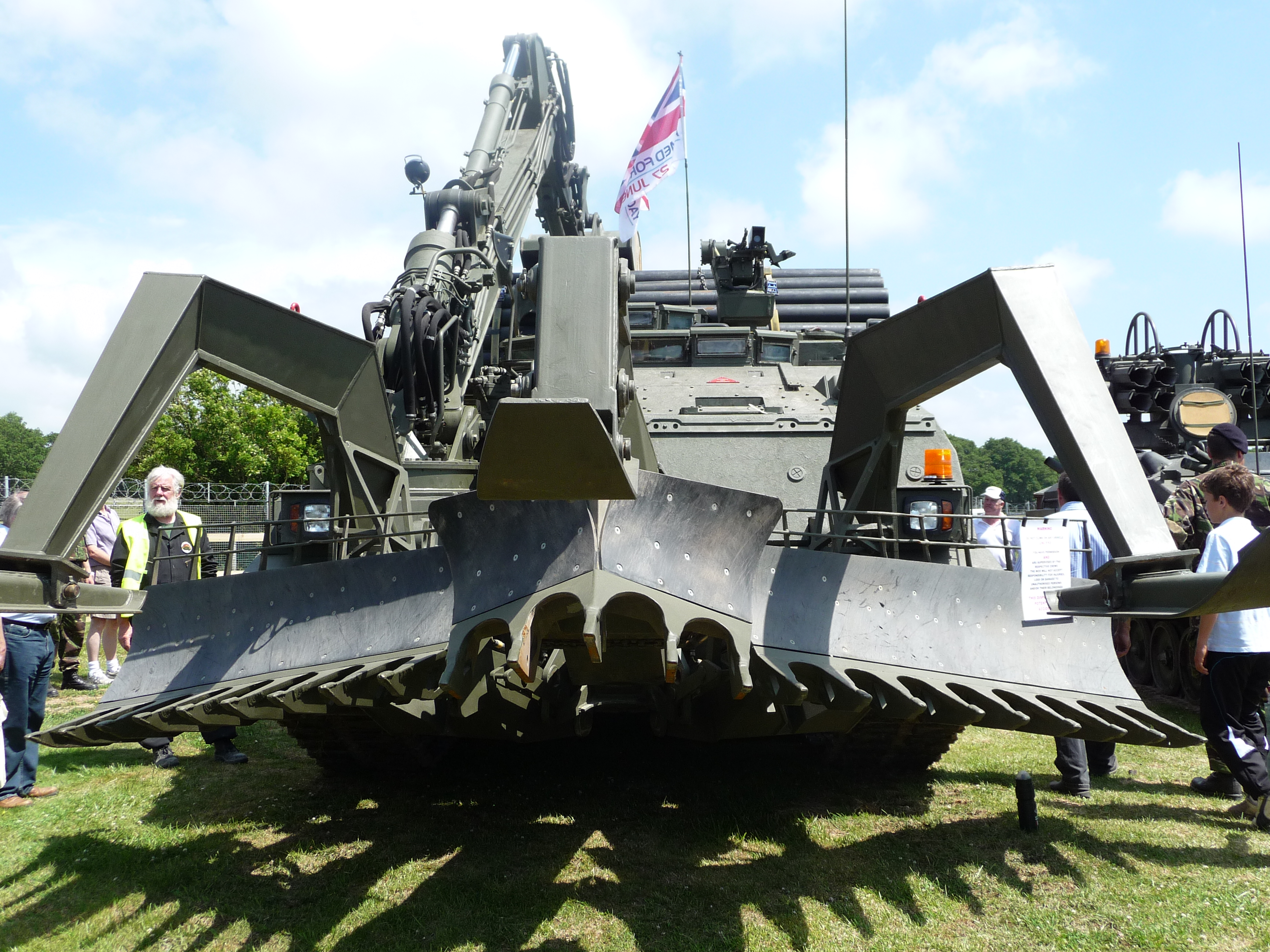
TROJAN

AVRE functions have been combined with others into the Trojan Combat Engineer Vehicle (CEV) based on the Challenger 2 chassis.

Trojan is equipped with an articulated excavator arm, a dozer blade and rails for fascines.

33 units were ordered from BAE Systems Land Systems.

== Operational history ==
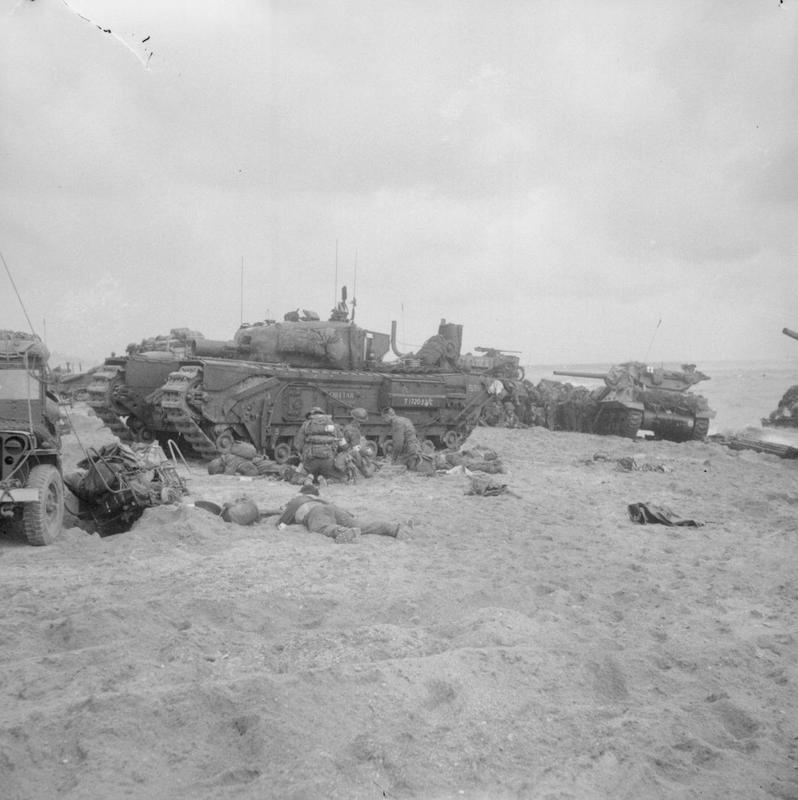
AVRE on the Normandy beach during the D-Day landings

Churchill III and IV AVRE vehicles were successfully used to breach defences in the D-Day landings, and continued in use through the rest of the allied advance to Nazi Germany.

The Petard Mortar's ability to demolish obstructions and fortifications proved valuable to the allied advance, while the morale impact of seeing the large gun caused many enemies to abandon their positions. AVRE vehicles were frequently teamed with Churchill Crocodile flamethrowers for bunker clearance. The AVRE would crack the defences, allowing the flamethrower to soak the interior with flammable liquid, incapacitating the occupants.

Centurion AVRE and Chieftain CHAVRE vehicles were both successfully used in Operation Granby in the early 1990s.

Extended use of the Centurion AVRE made the Centurion tank, developed during the latter half of the second world war, the longest serving military vehicle in the British Army.

== Attachments and accessories ==
=== Demolitions ===
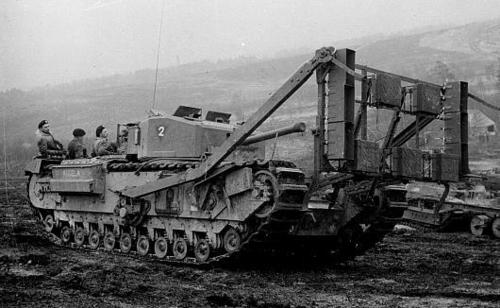
Churchill "Double Onion" tank, could place demolition charges at heights up to 12 feet

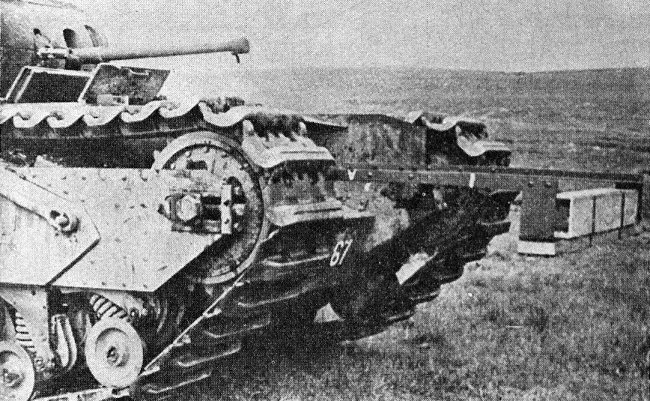
Light Carrot tank, like the Double Onion used to demolish walls

The Carrot provided explosive charges on metal prongs extended from the front of the vehicle. These could be pushed up to an obstacle, released, and fired from within the vehicle, protecting engineers from the need to exit the safety of the armoured vehicle interior.

Onion built upon the Carrot concept providing a much larger frame of explosives to blow a larger gap in concrete obstacles.

Goat provided a similar frame of explosives to Onion and Carrot, but carried horizontally to allow a much greater charge to be carried. This was released by prongs extending from the front, allowing it to pivot into a vertical position before detaching from the vehicle.

=== Mine clearance ===
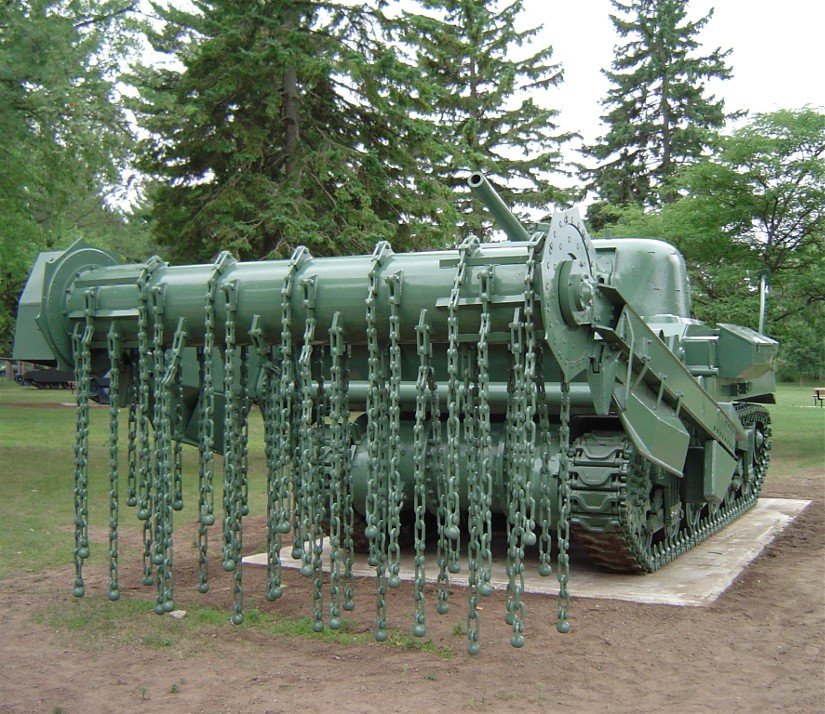
A preserved, World War II, Sherman Crab – an M4 Sherman tank fitted with a flail

During World War II the Sherman Crab was the primary (and most effective) mine clearance vehicle for the 79th Armoured Division, but AVREs carried a range of mine clearance devices to supplement them.

A Lane marker attachment could be fitted to the sides of the AVRE to delineate lanes through minefields or cleared terrain. Similar to the Sherman Crab, it deployed both tape and lights.

Snake was a mine-clearing line charge consisted of sections of 3-inch pipe filled with explosive to extend and then detonate across a minefield. The concept is similar to the bangalore torpedo but Snake is much larger – Snake pipes run the length of the AVRE vehicle with multiple pipes carried on the trackguards of modified AVREs. Once assembled together into longer lengths, Snake could be towed by the AVRE into position, and then pushed across a minefield. A shaped end was created for the Snake to prevent it digging into the ground when pushed. Detonation destroyed the mines along the length of the pipe, forming a large path across the minefield.

Conger was a similar device to Snake, providing a rocket propelled flexible tube that was carried in, and launched from, a converted engineless Universal Carrier towed behind the AVRE. Once in position, the hose was propelled by an attached rocket across the minefield. The tube was pump-filled with a special nitroglycerine based explosive known as 822C. The device was used operationally during the D-Day invasions, but operations were stopped after an explosion near the village of IJzendijke. In preparations for use for an upcoming attack, more than a ton of 822C detonated while being unloaded from two lorries. The explosion caused numerous casualties and destroyed four nearby AVREs, while the lorries "disappeared".

Giant Viper is a post-war re-working of the Conger concept using a trailer and pre-filled, safer, hose and explosive. It was used with Centurion and Chieftain AVREs (and other vehicles) and saw use in the Iraq conflict with them. It has been replaced with the Python minefield breaching system.

Anti-mine Plough was used to avoid cratering an approach and rendering it impassible to following vehicles. A number of types have been used. These push the mines to the sides of the vehicle where they can be dealt with later by sappers on foot.

Alternatively, mine rollers like the Canadian Indestructible Roller Device (CIRD) could detonate mines ahead of the vehicle by applying a vehicle-like ground weight. These pivoted up on their mountings upon explosion before dropping back down to continue.

=== Tracks and roadways ===
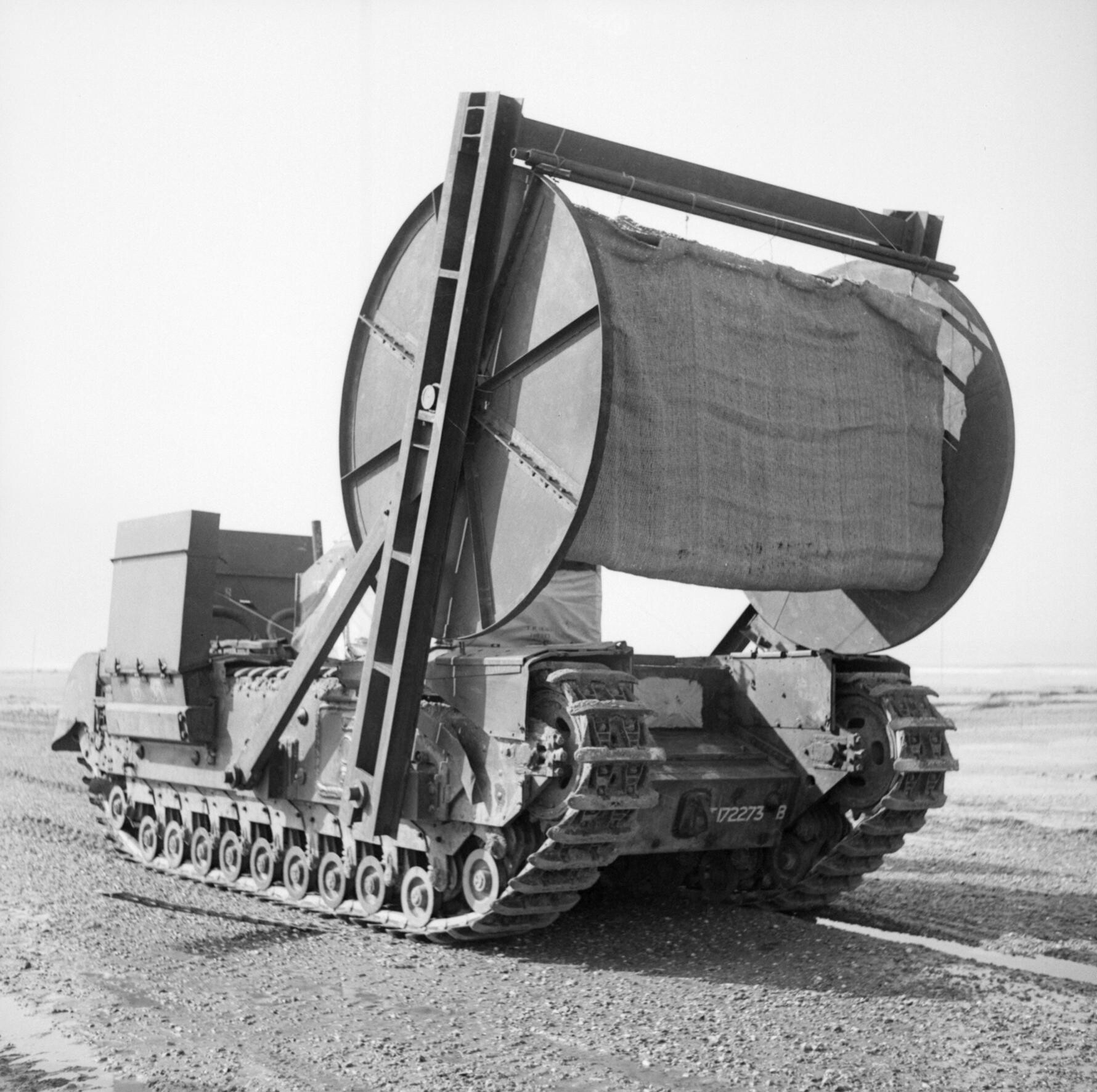
Churchill AVRE with Bobbin

Roly-Poly and Bobbin both provided a track laying roll in front of the AVRE over which the AVRE drove (known as "carpet laying"). This provided a roadway over soft ground which the tanks would otherwise sink into. Roly-Poly used steel roller shuttering while Bobbin used reinforced fabric matting. Both were used on D-Day.

Log Carpet provided an alternative formed of chain-linked logs. This was folded flat on raised supports over the AVRE with an explosive charge to release the front. The log carpet would then drop down in front of the tank log-by-log, with the weight dragging further logs from the top. Logs were robust, each,14 ft long by 27 in. diameter linked with 2 in. wire rope. This proved a challenge to load, and Log Carpet AVREs had to be driven into a pit to enable the logs to be loaded at ground-level.

Log Carpet could also be fitted to the unit's LVT4 Buffalo amphibious vehicles, and was particularly effective on waterlogged ground.

Class 30 and Class 60 Trackways were later developments in the 1960s following extensive cold-war exercises in Germany, similar to Roly-Poly.

=== Bridging and gap clearance ===
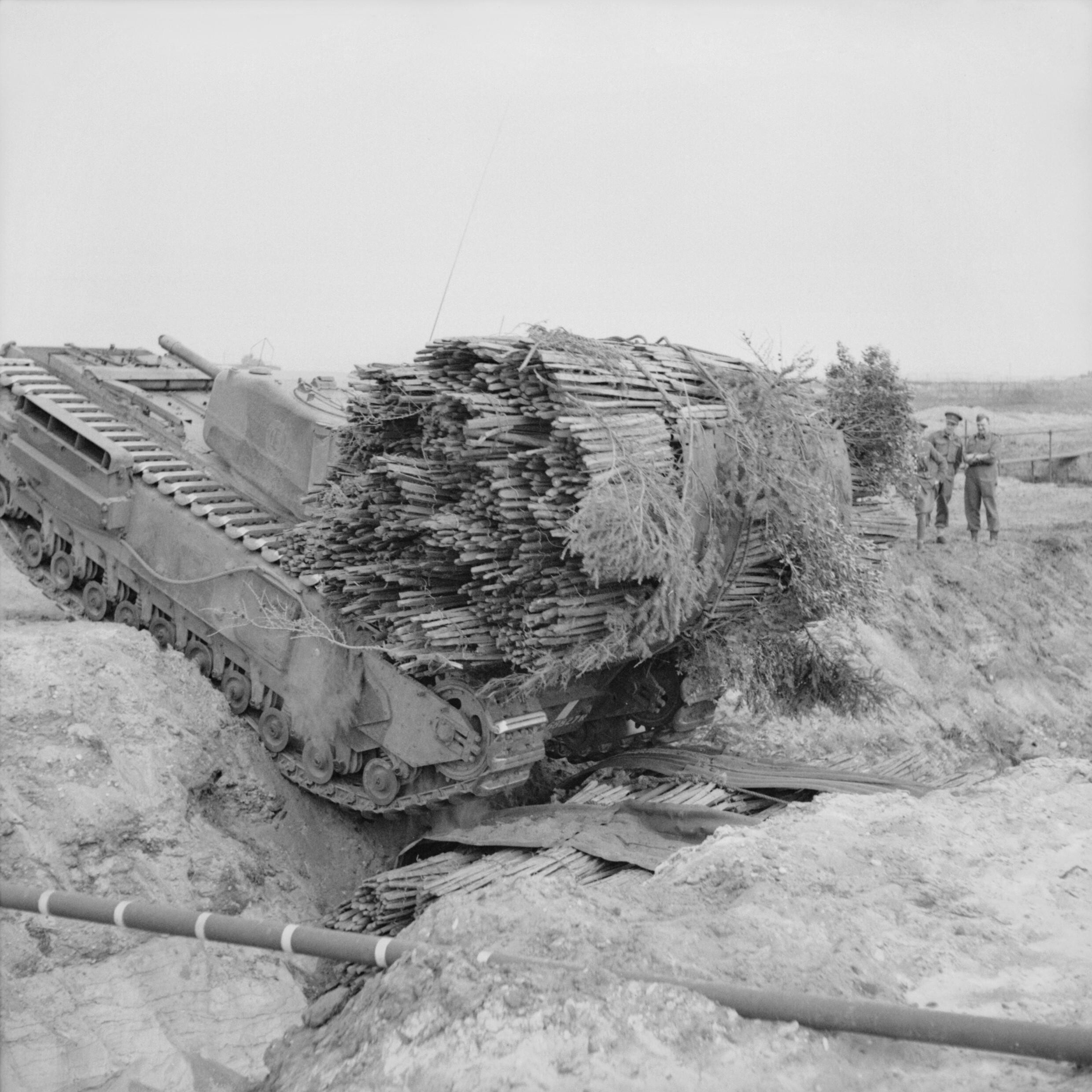
AVRE carrying a fascine over a similar fascine

During World War II, the AVRE was provided with a platform allowing a fascine to be carried on the vehicle front while the turret was traversed through 90 degrees. This could be released from within the vehicle to drop into gaps and ditches, allowing tanks (commencing with the AVRE itself) to cross, or angle up and over a ridge.

AVRE's could also be modified with mounts and supports to carry a ready-assembled Small Box Girder Bridge from the front glacis plate. This could be dropped over gaps similar to traditional engineer bridging, or used to provide a ramp over a wall. Later, a towed version of the Small Box Girder Bridge was also developed, and was able to traverse a Bailey bridge for gaps further along the assault.

A 60 ft section of Bailey bridge could also be pushed as the "Skid Bailey", with the leading sections raised slightly by winch to overcome obstacles. This allowed larger gaps to be breached. Trials and training were also conducted with the Bailey Mobile Bridge, providing 150 ft of bridge articulated on tracks at the centre, and the Brown Bailey, carrying 140 ft of Bailey bridge between two tanks, the rear AVRE launching the bridge over rollers on the front vehicle.

Post-war a Folding Small Box Girder Bridge was also developed, articulating in the middle.

AVRE bridging can be distinguished from the Armoured Ramp Carrier (ARK) by both purpose and operator. AVRE bridges leverage the AVRE to enable Royal Engineers to more safely accomplish traditional bridging activities where an ARK may not be appropriate. The ARK is intended to rapidly deploy a ramp or smaller gap bridge without the need for specialised engineering skillset, simply by driving into it. An AVRE deployed fascine could be used to raise the front of the ARK if needed, such as ahead of large sea walls. Latterly ARK vehicles were used by the Royal Armoured Corps to undertake the task

Armoured vehicle-launched bridge (AVLB) bridge-layer vehicles have replaced AVRE bridging in more recent years, although fascines are still carried for smaller obstacles.

=== AVRE trailers ===
An Armoured Sled was provided for AVRE with droppable sides, allowing further engineering supplies to be dragged by the vehicle. Engineers also used Gutted Carrier based on the universal carrier or its predecessor vehicles, for the same purpose. These were stripped of engine and internals, and dragged using the same linkage used for Conger.

Post war, a dedicated AVRE trailer, designated "Trailer, Cargo, 7 1/2 ton, 4 wheeled, Centurion A.V.R.E." provided a cross country load carrying capability behind the AVRE.

== Related engineering vehicles ==
Related vehicles provided dedicated bridging and mine clearance, becoming the Armoured Ramp Carrier (ARK), Armoured vehicle-launched bridge (AVLB) and Mine flail (Lobster, Crab) vehicles.

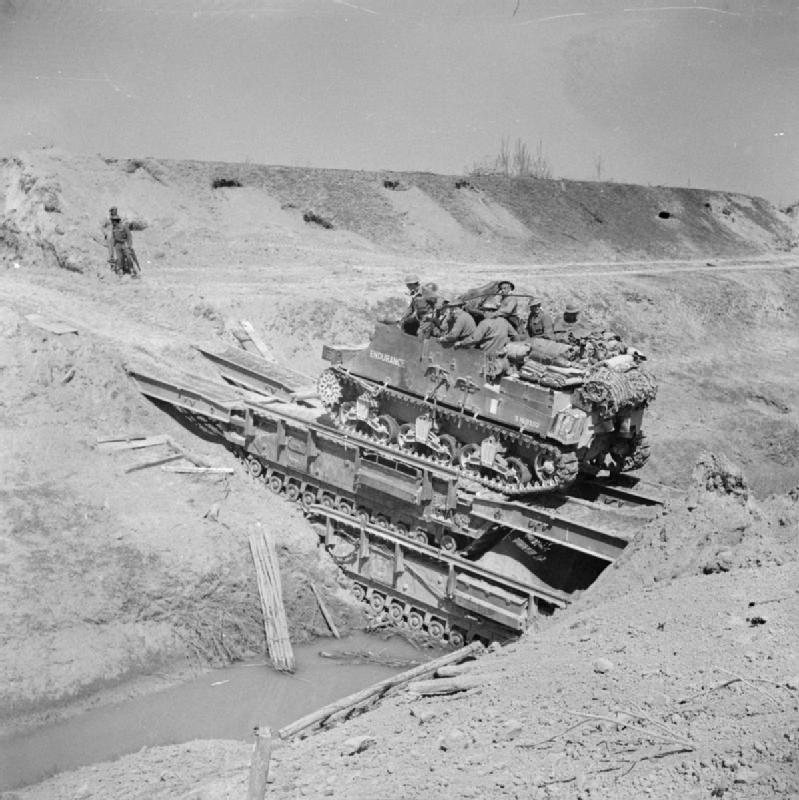
2 Churchill ARKs bridging a difficult obstacle

=== List of vehicles deployed ===
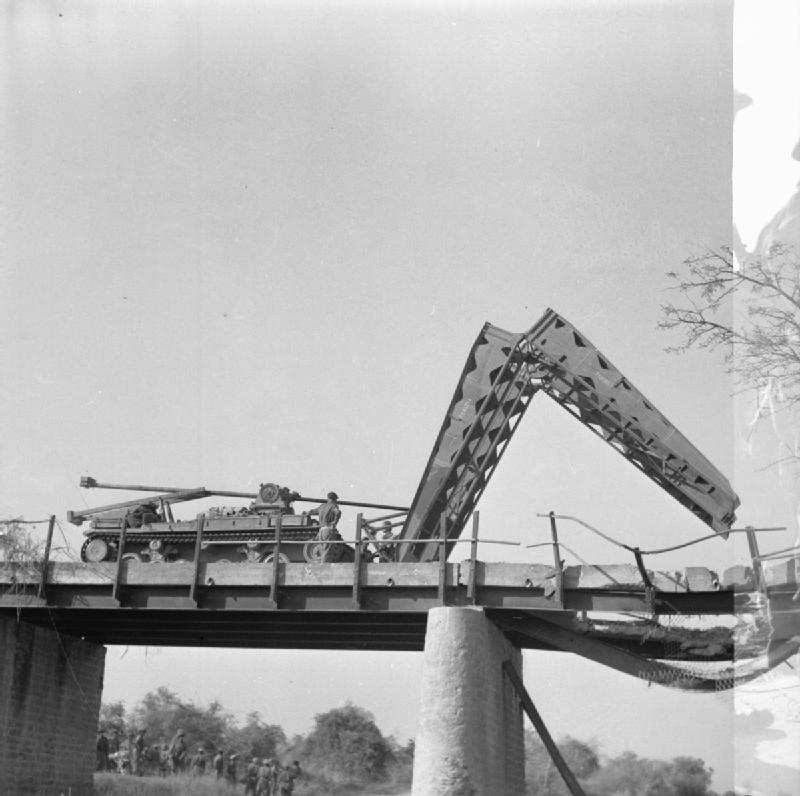
Valentine Bridgelayer

Mark I tank Heavy RE tank variants

- Bridgelayer, a Mark V tank, with canal lock bridge
- Mine clearer, a Mark V tank, with mine rollers

Light Tank Mk V

- Bridgelayer, scissors assault bridge

Covenanter tank

- Bridgelayer, deploying a Class 24 scissors bridge

Valentine tank

- Valentine Mk II, deploying a Class 30 scissors bridge

FV180 Combat Engineer Tractor (CET)

- 143 units were supplied, it entered service in 1977, providing earth moving functions.

Shielder Vehicle Launched Scatterable Mine System

- Essentially a modified BAE Systems Land Systems Stormer with the Alliant Techsystems Volcano mine delivery system, 30 have been delivered

Challenger variants

- Titan AVLB, also based on the Challenger 2 chassis, the Titan Armoured Vehicle Launched Bridge, 33 units have been ordered from BAE Land Systems

Terrier CET

- Development to replace the FV180. Substantial use of commercial off-the-shelf parts is part of the design of the vehicle, including a Caterpillar drive train (C18 diesel engine and an X300 series automatic transmission) and excavator. It also uses the alloy road wheels from the BAE Systems Combat Vehicle 90 programme. The Terrier is armoured using steel rather than the aluminium alloy of its predecessor.

== See also ==
- Hobart's Funnies
- Military engineering vehicle
