= Trojan armoured engineer vehicle =

Trojan
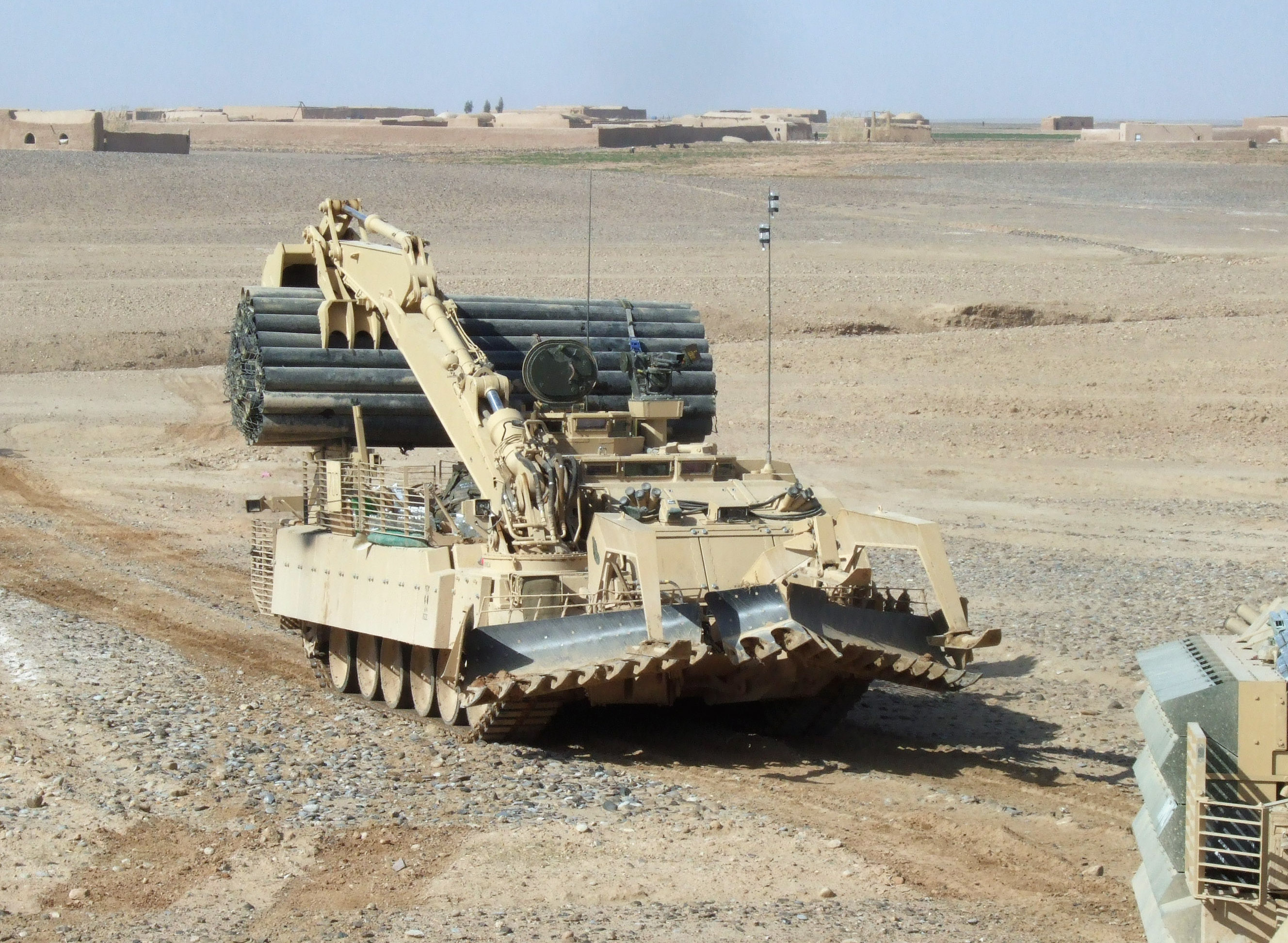
- A Trojan AEV in Afghanistan during 2010
- Type: Combat engineering vehicle
- Place of origin: United Kingdom

Service history
- In service: 2007–present
- Used by: Royal Engineers
- Wars: Operation Moshtarak, Afghanistan (since 2010)

Production history
- Designed: 2000s
- Manufacturer: BAE Systems Land Systems
- Unit cost: ~£4,217,000; ~$6,694,400; ~€5,338,860
- Produced: 2004–
- No. built: 33

Specifications
- Mass: 62.5 tonnes (61.5 long tons; 68.9 short tons)
- Length: 8.3 m (27 ft 3 in) 11.50 m (37 ft 9 in)
- Width: 3.5 m (11 ft 6 in) (Note: 4.2 m (13 ft 9 in) with appliqué armour)
- Height: 2.5 m (8 ft 2 in)
- Crew: 3 (commander, operator, driver)
- Armour: Chobham/Dorchester Level 2 (classified),
- Main armament: 7.62 mm L94A1 (remote controlled)
- Engine: Perkins CV12-8A Diesel; 1,200 hp (890 kW)
- Power/weight: 19.2 hp/t (14.2 kW/t)
- Transmission: David Brown TN54ETS epicyclic transmission (6 fwd, 2 rev.)
- Suspension: Hydropneumatic
- Operational range: 450 km (280 mi)
- Maximum speed: 59 km/h (37 mph) 40 km/h (25 mph) off road

The Trojan armoured engineer vehicle (AEV) is a combat engineering vehicle of the British Army. It is used to breach minefields and for many other tasks. It is currently in use with the Royal Engineers and as such is an AVRE.

== Design ==
The Trojan armoured engineer vehicle is based on a Challenger 2 tank chassis, but lacks the main armament. In place of the turret, it has a large hydraulic excavator arm, which can be used to excavate areas, move obstacles, and deposit the fascine that the Trojan carries at its rear. The Trojan is usually also fitted with a plough on the front, which enables it to clear mines, either detonating them on contact, or pushing them out of the way to clear a safe channel for following vehicles.

For self-defence only, it carries a 7.62mm machine gun.

For rapid mine-clearing purposes, the Trojan can also tow a trailer carrying the Python, a rocket-propelled hose similar to the Giant Viper. This allows for a much quicker way of clearing a path for ground forces. The hose, packed with explosive, is launched across a minefield, and detonates after it hits the ground, clearing a 7-metre wide path for 230 metres.

== History ==
The vehicles were built at BAE Systems Land Systems plant in Newcastle upon Tyne. The contract was awarded in 2001 to Vickers Defence Systems, who were bought by BAE Systems in 2004. The project was known as the Future Engineer Tank. 33 have been built. It was first used on exercise in May 2007.

A number of Trojans are permanently based in Canada at British Army Training Unit Suffield in order to allow the Royal Engineers to support Armoured Battle Groups on major exercises.

Trojans were first deployed operationally by the British Army to Afghanistan in 2009 engaging in their first advance under contact in 2010. During Operation Moshtarak 28 Engineer Regiment operated the Trojan attempting to use its traditional mine clearance equipment in the Counter-IED role in support of a major British Army advance.

Its companion vehicle, developed at the same time, is another variant of the Challenger 2, the Titan armoured bridge layer, of which 33 have also been built.

== See also ==
- M1150 Assault Breacher Vehicle – similar US engineering vehicle
- Armoured Vehicle Royal Engineers – a type of vehicle largely replaced by the new Trojan AEV
- Combat engineer vehicle
