= Anti-personnel obstacle breaching system =

American explosive line charge

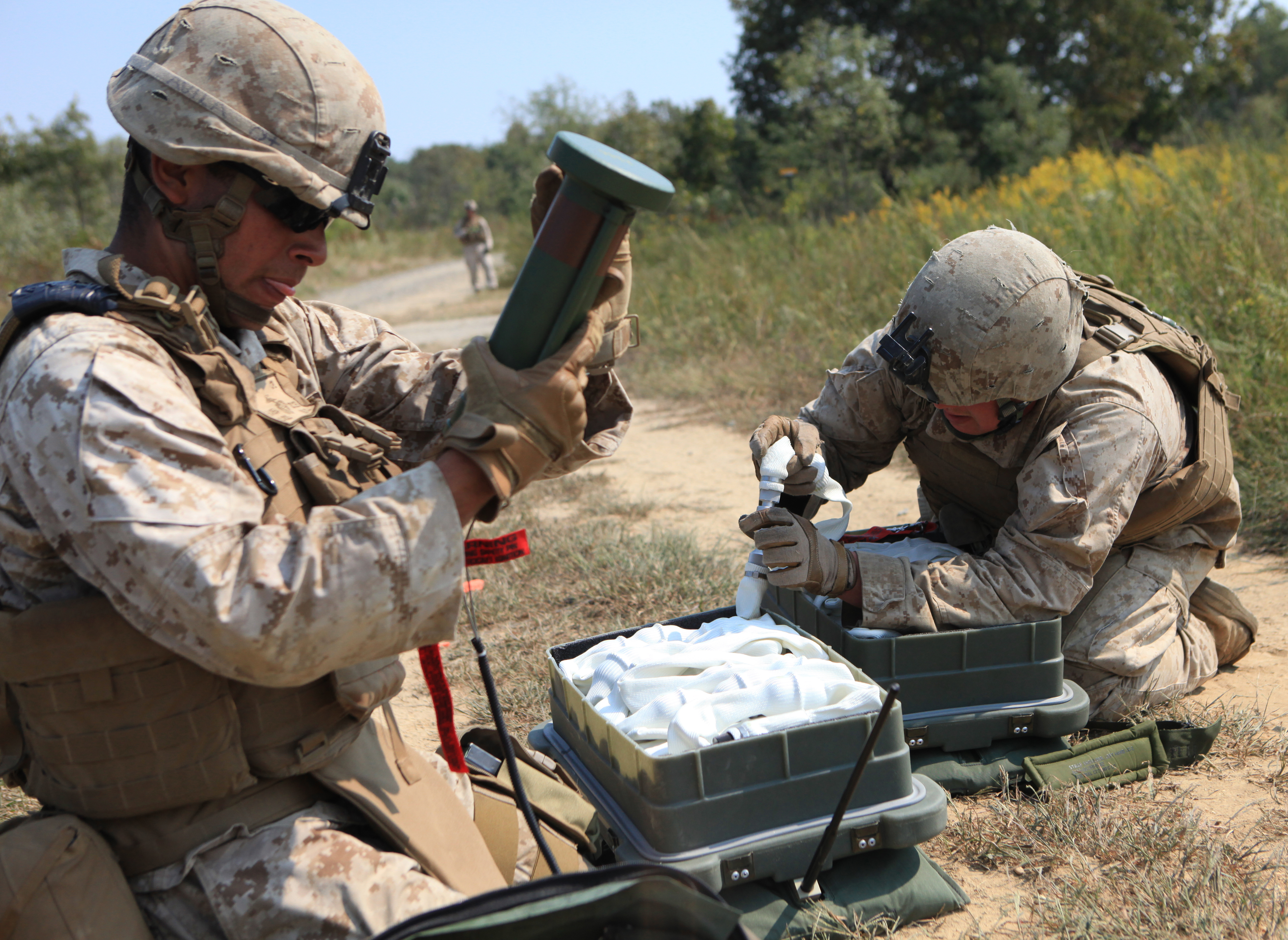
U.S. Marines demonstrate assembling the APOBS system

The anti-personnel obstacle breaching system (APOBS) is an explosive line charge system which allows safe breaching through complex antipersonnel obstacles, particularly fields of land mines. The APOBS is a joint DoD program for the United States Army and the United States Marine Corps.

== History ==
The anti-personnel obstacle breaching system originated as an operational requirements document published by the US Army Engineer School, Fort Leonard Wood, MO. The joint requirements document was signed by the Army and the Marines in April 1994. The system was developed by the United States Army Research, Development and Engineering Command – Armament Research, Development and Engineering Center (RDECOM-ARDEC), Picatinny Arsenal, New Jersey, and produced by Ensign-Bickford Aerospace and Defense. During preliminary test and evaluation, the original explosive grenade attachment scheme proved inadequate, resulting in program delay and the Naval Surface Warfare Center sponsoring a complete line-charge analysis and manufacturing redesign. The subsequently proposed and highly successful woven nylon over-wrap is currently employed on the Mk 7 Mod 1, fielded in 2002, and the Mod 2 fielded in 2006.

== Use ==
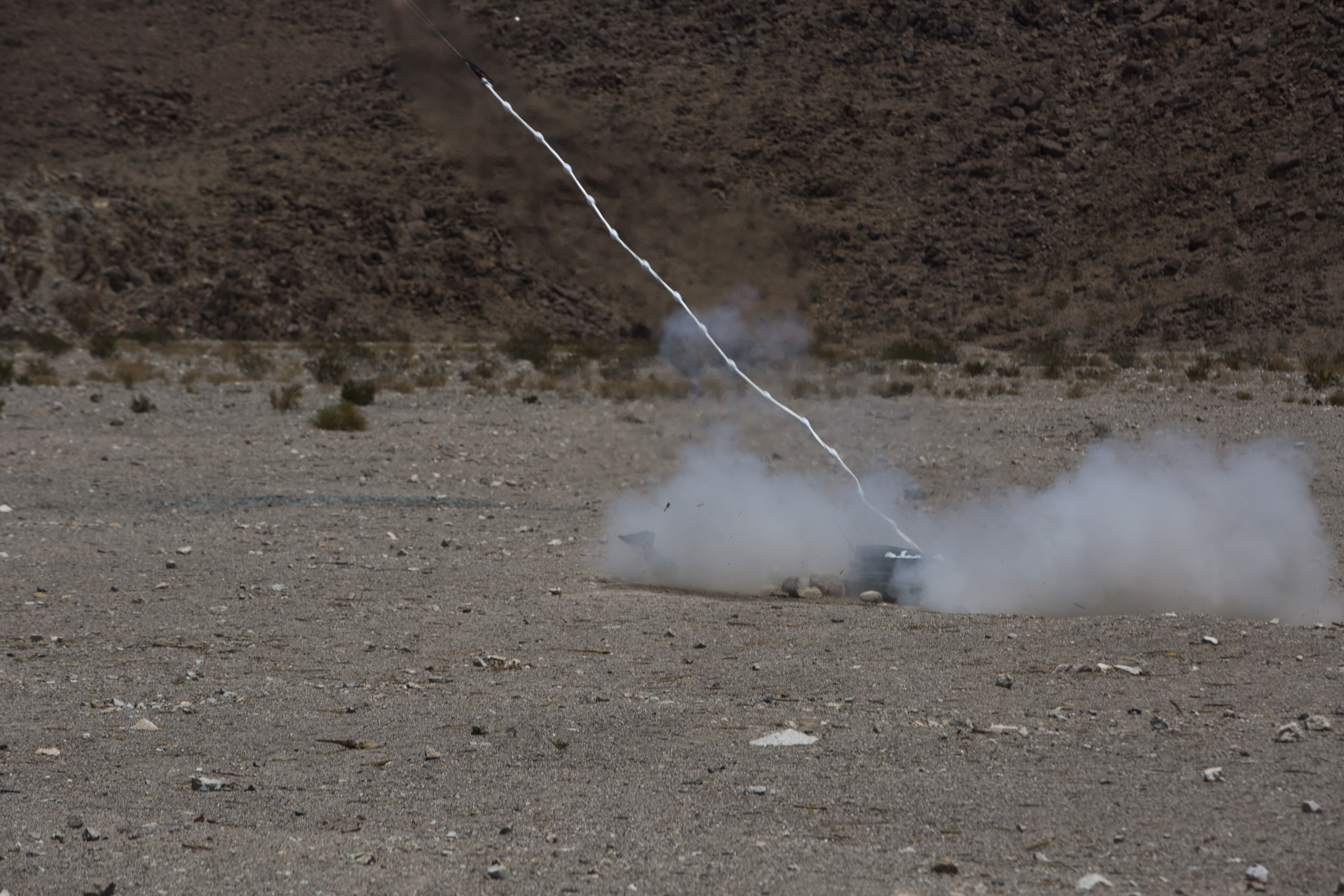
APOBS in use

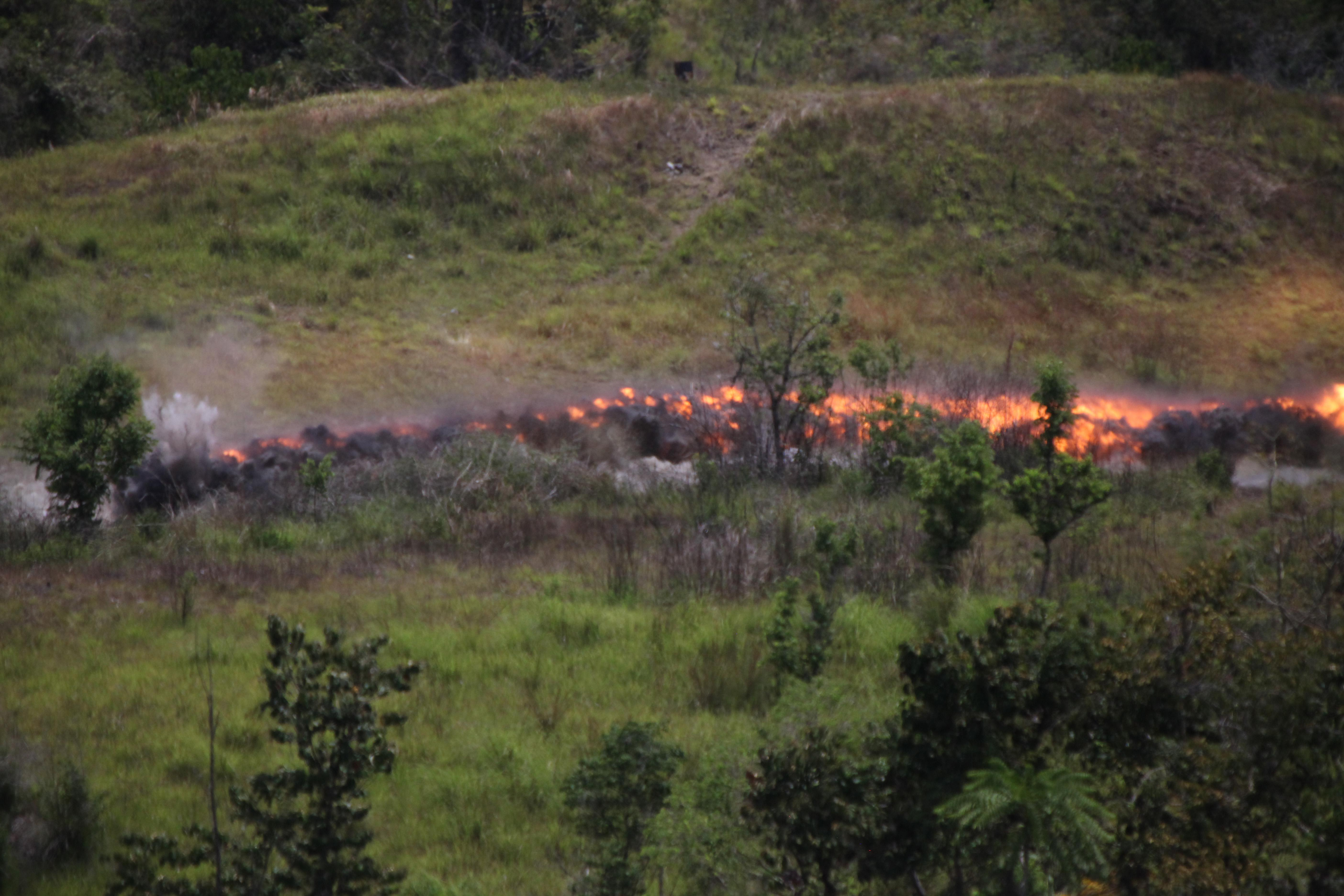
Line detonation

The APOBS is used to conduct deliberate or hasty breaches through enemy antipersonnel minefields and multi-strand wire obstacles. It is light enough to be carried by two soldiers with backpacks and can be deployed within two minutes.

Once set in place, the APOBS rocket is fired from a 35-meter standoff position, sending the line charge with fragmentation grenades over a minefield or wire obstacle. The grenades neutralize or clear the mines and sever the wire, clearing a 45-meter-long footpath for troops.

The APOBS replaces the Bangalore torpedo, which is heavier when all sections are used together, takes significantly longer to set up, and cannot be deployed from a standoff position. It reduces the number of soldiers required to carry and employ the system to two, as opposed to as many as 12 for a Bangalore torpedo using all sections.

The 125-pound system includes these features:

- Delay and command firing modes
- Deployable within 90 seconds
- Deployable from a 35-meter standoff
- Clears antipersonnel mines and complex wire obstacles
- Clears a footpath up to 1 meter by 45 meters

As a certified insensitive munition, the APOBS is safe to employ and transport.

=== Current usage ===
The U.S. Army and U.S. Marine Corps have used the APOBS to clear improvised explosive devices in southern Afghanistan.

== See also ==
- Giant Viper – a vehicle-launched mine clearance system
- Mine-clearing line charge
