= M58 MICLIC =

Rocket-projected explosive line charge

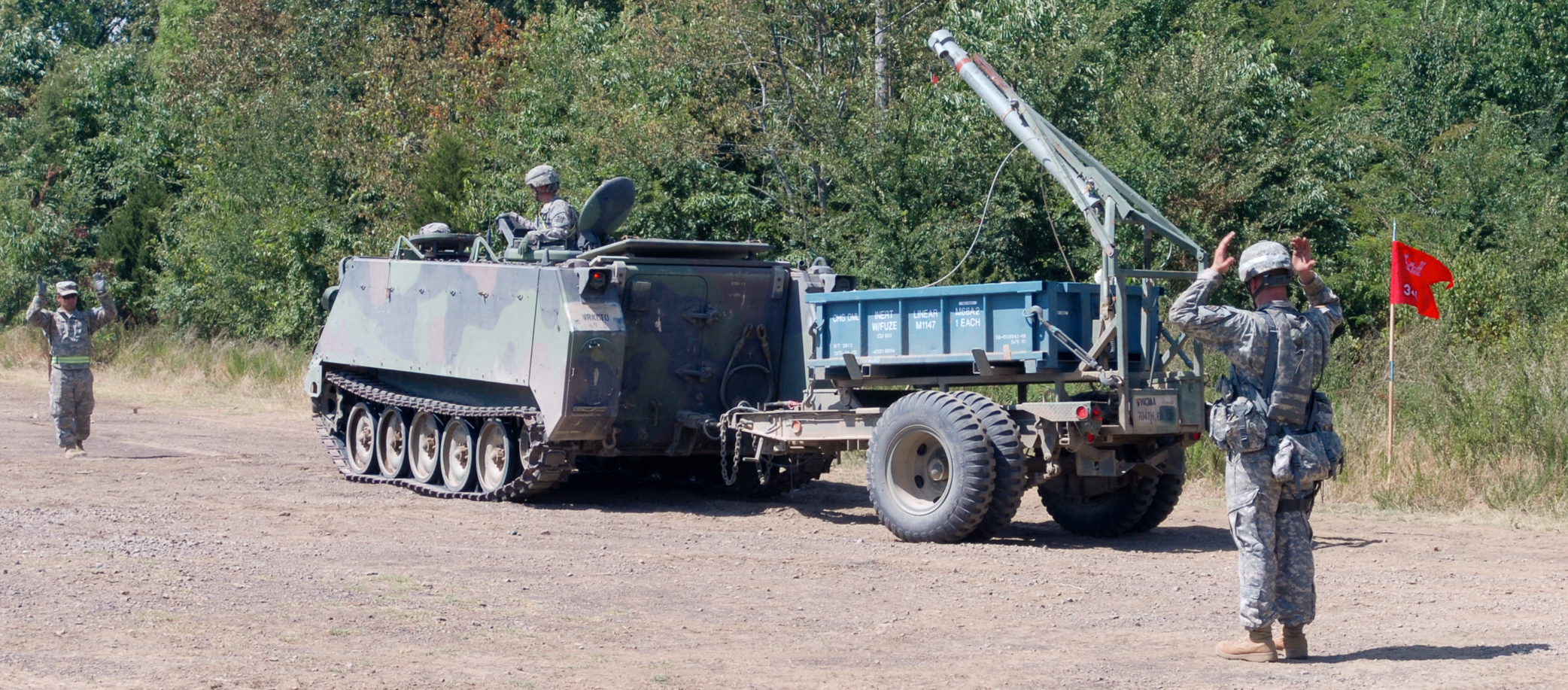
Soldiers guide an M113 APC onto the range to launch the M58 mine-clearing line charge (MICLIC) at Fort Chaffee, Arkansas, July 19, 2011.

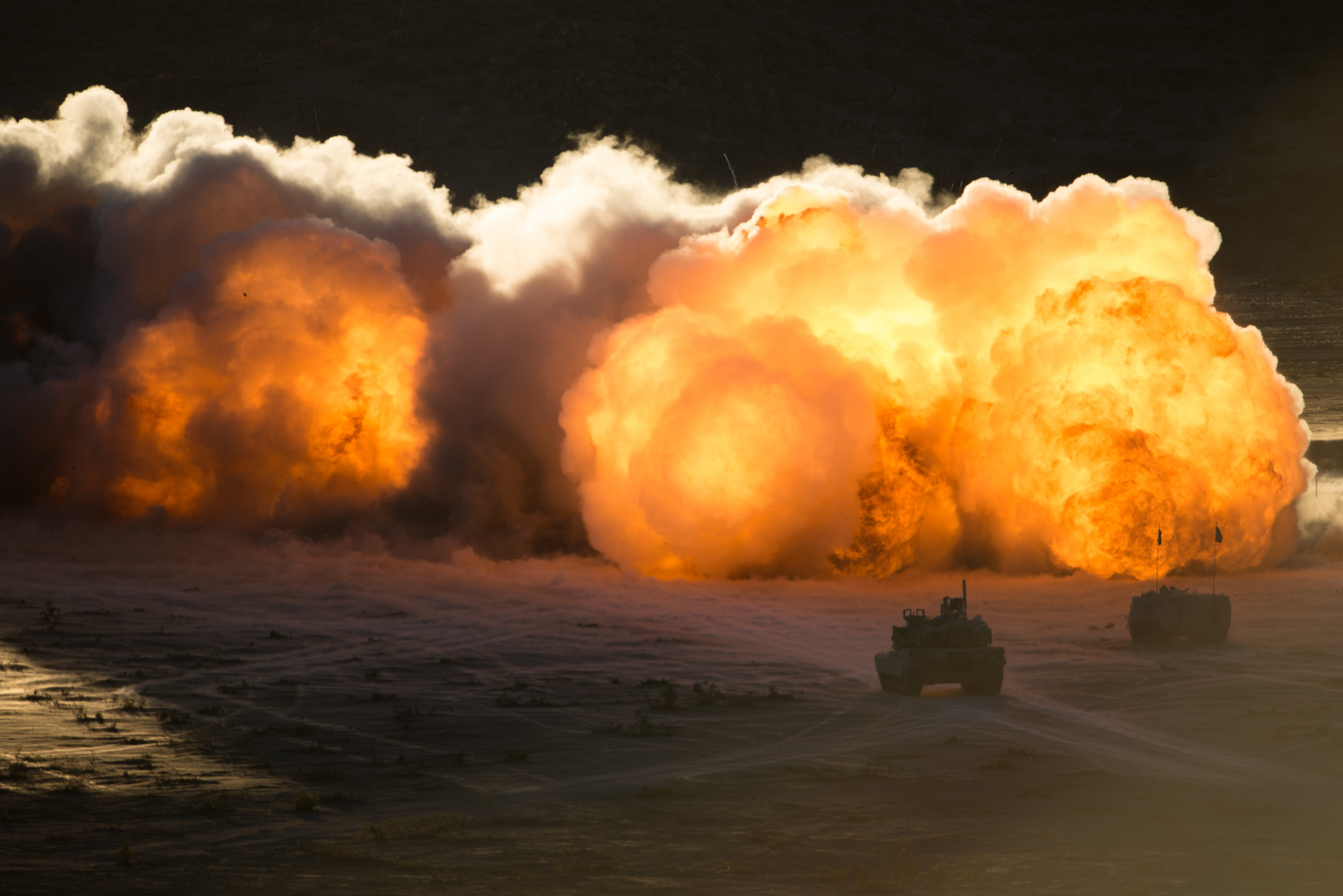
Arkansas Army National Guard soldiers detonate an M58 mine-clearing line charge (MICLIC) at the National Training Center (NTC), Fort Irwin, California, 16 August 2015.

The M58 mine-clearing line charge (MICLIC) is a rocket-projected mine-clearing line charge used to provide a "close-in" demining capability for maneuver forces of the United States Army and Marine Corps.

First fielded in 1988 with United States Army Europe, the MICLIC is a cable fitted with explosive charges. Drawn by a rocket into a minefield, the cable lands in a straight line and detonates, destroying conventionally fuzed land mines in a lane eight meters wide and 100 meters long (8.75 yards by 109 yards).

== Technical specification ==
The MICLIC system consists of an M353 3½ ton (3,175 kg) or M200A1 2½ ton (2,268 kg) trailer (or M200 tracked trailer) chassis, a launcher assembly, an M147 firing kit, an M58A3 line charge and a 5-inch (127mm) MK22 Mod 4 rocket. The line charge is 350 feet (107 meters) long and contains 5 pounds (2.27 kg) per linear foot of C-4 explosive. If a MICLIC fails to detonate normally, it can be manually activated by time-delay fuses every few feet along its length. The M147 firing kit can also be mounted on the M60 AVLB and the M1150 Assault Breacher Vehicle.

Each M58 MICLIC line charge cost about $83,000 in fiscal 2018.

== Use ==
On September 15, 2022, the United States Department of Defense announced the U.S. would supply mine clearing equipment, including the M58 MICLIC, to Ukraine during the Russian invasion of Ukraine. In November 2022, the Armed Forces of Ukraine released a photo of their forces using the M58 MICLIC. On January 17, 2024, a video purported to show a Russian munition dropping from a drone to destroy an M58 MICLIC system and the MaxxPro MRAP that was towing it.
