= Mine plow =

Device to clear minefield

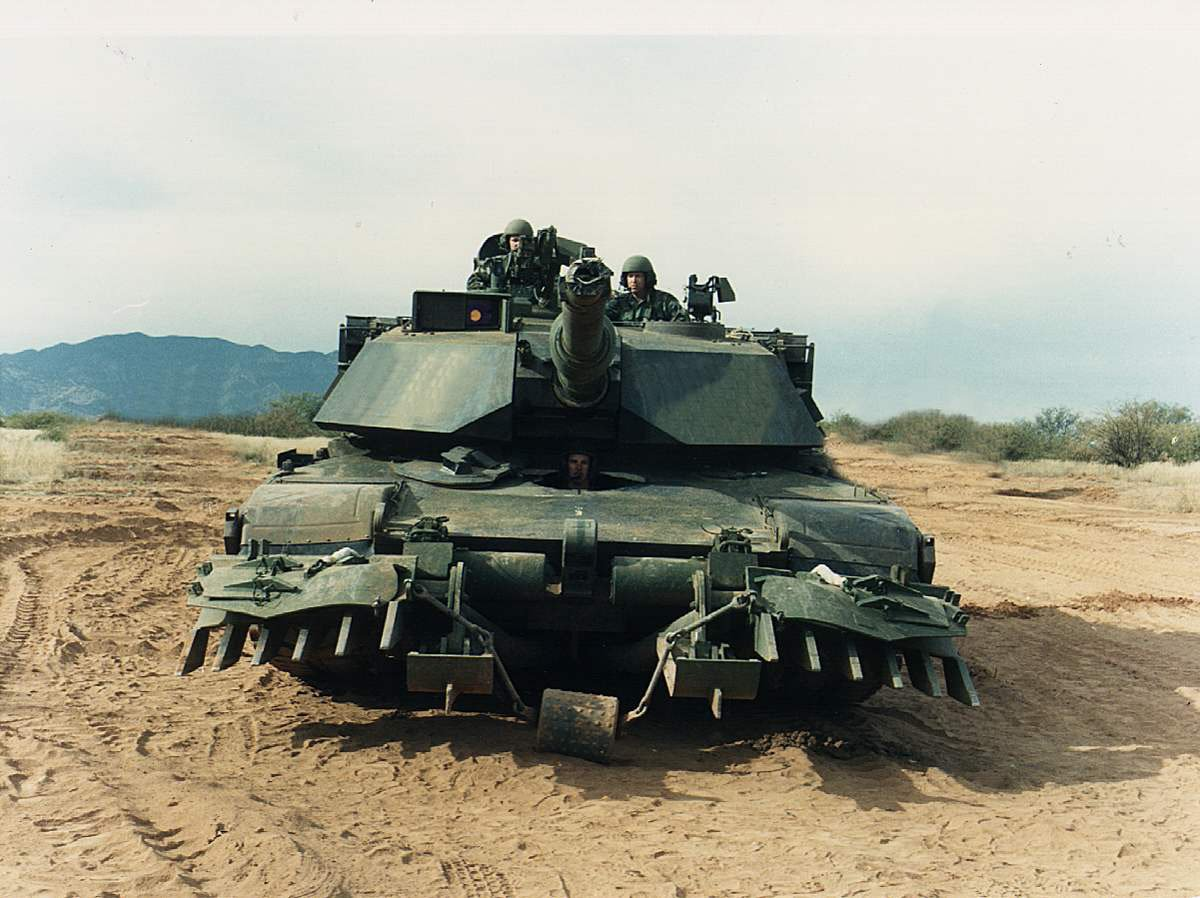
U.S. Army M1A1 Abrams tank with mine plow from 1995 or earlier

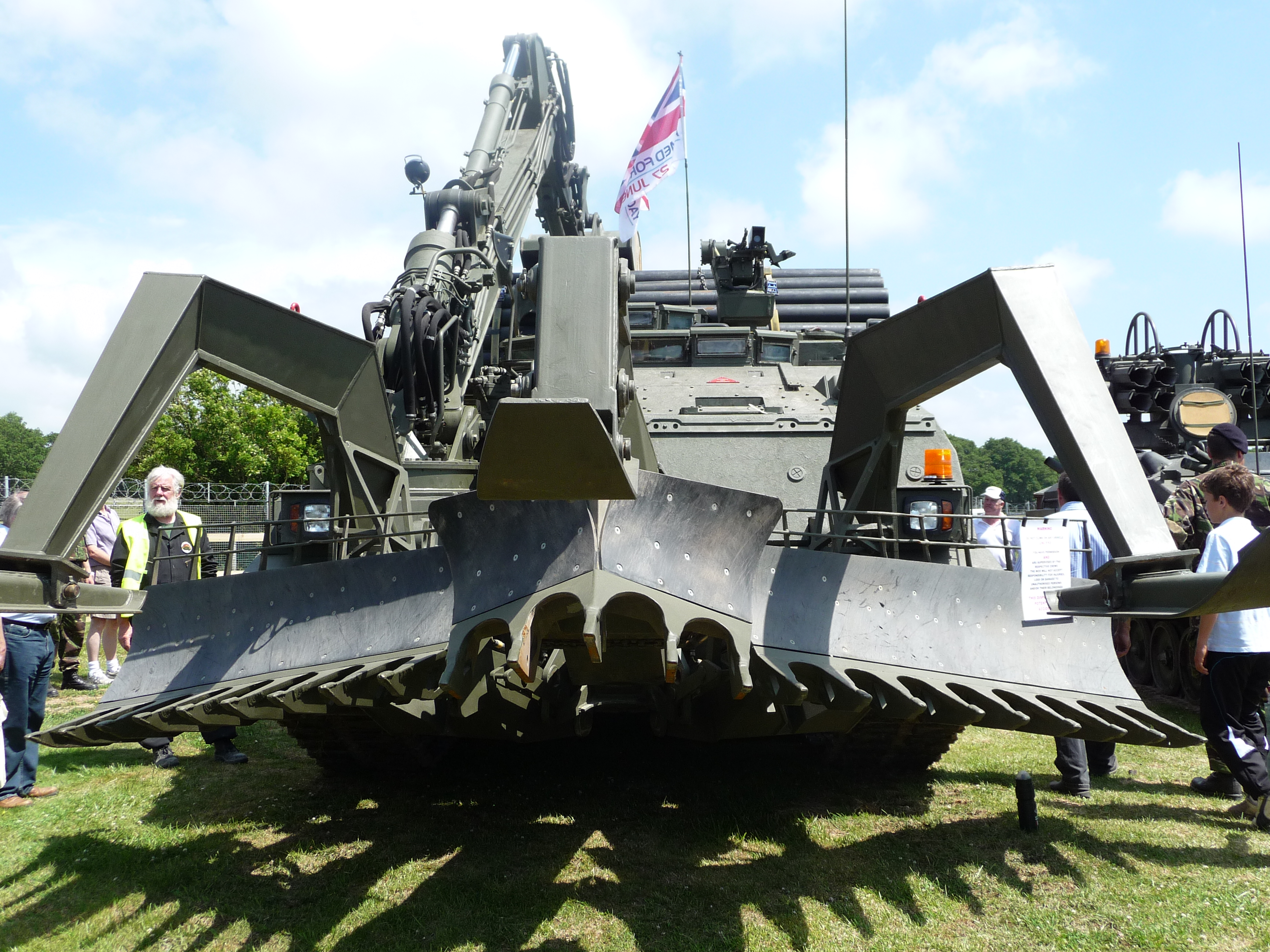
Trojan AVRE of the Royal Engineers with full-width mine plow and fascine.

A mine plow (plough in British English) is a device designed to clear a lane through a minefield, allowing other vehicles to follow. A mine plow is typically mounted to a tank or military engineering vehicle. Buried land mines are plowed up and pushed outside the tank's track path or tipped over. Since modern anti-tank mines rely on a focused explosion to destroy armored vehicles, they are useless when turned upside-down; as the tank runs over the mine, it will expend its blast down instead of upwards, causing insignificant damage, if any.

== History ==
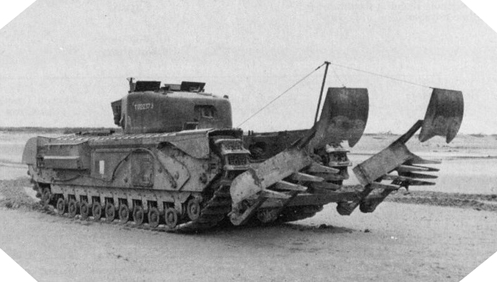
Churchill Bullshorn Plough

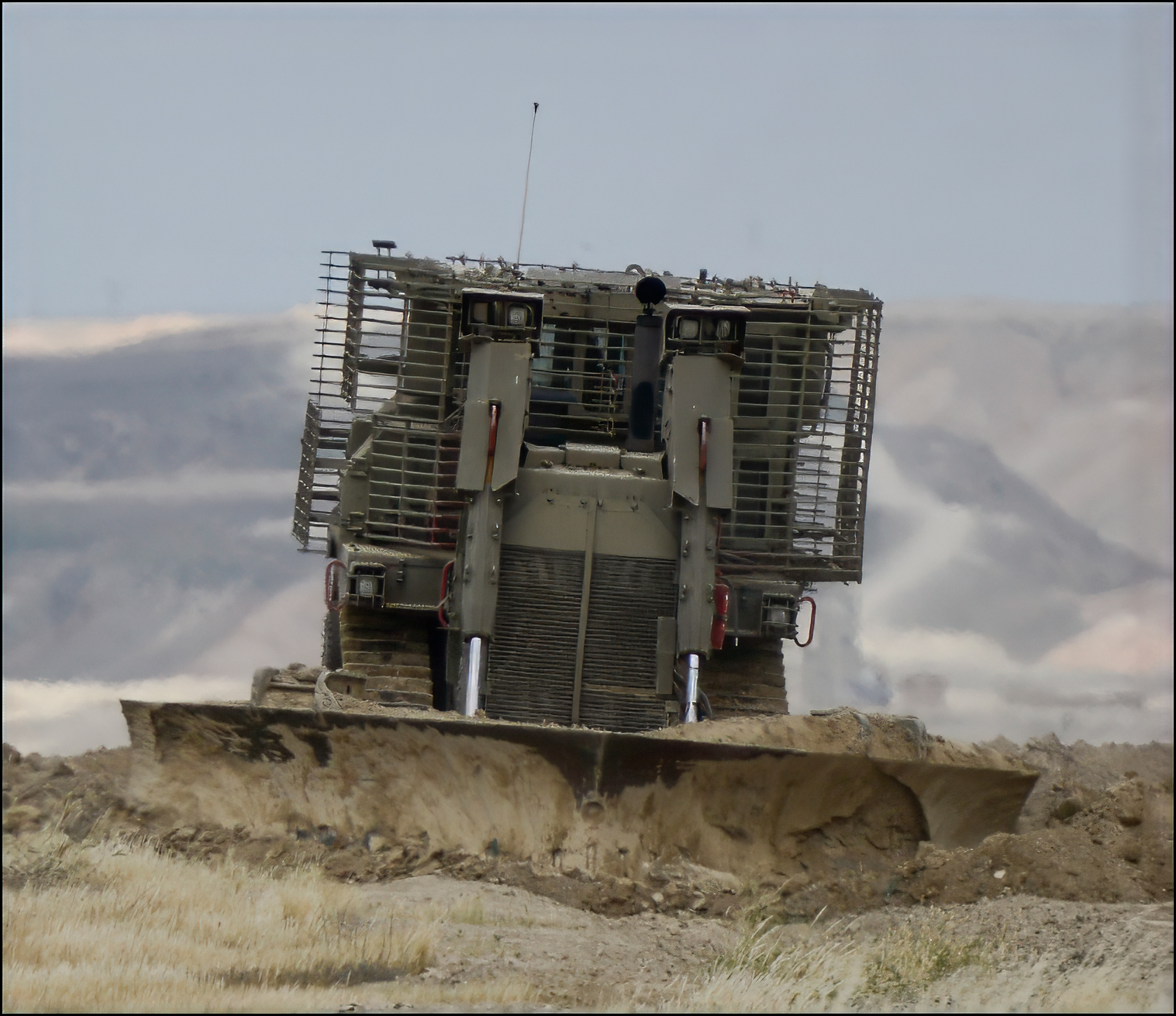
IDF Caterpillar D9 armored bulldozer clearing mines in the Jordan Valley.

Towards the end of the First World War, the French mounted a plow on their Renault FT tank.

The British started work on plow designs in 1937, and a successful design was introduced for the Matilda Mk I tank though it was not used.

The first recorded combat use is by a "Bullshorn" plow on a Churchill tank of the British 79th Armoured Division, on Sword Beach during the Allied invasion of Normandy (this was one of "Hobart's Funnies" specialized vehicles). The "Bullshorn" was one of a number of plow designs which were tested and used by the British Army.

The mine plow is still in use by many combat engineering units. The Royal Engineers have deployed the Trojan to Afghanistan where it was usually fitted with a plow on the front, which enables it to clear mines, either detonating them on contact, or pushing them out of the way to clear a safe channel for following vehicles.

== See also ==
- Mine roller
- Mine flail
