= Mine-clearing line charge =

Explosive charges used for demining

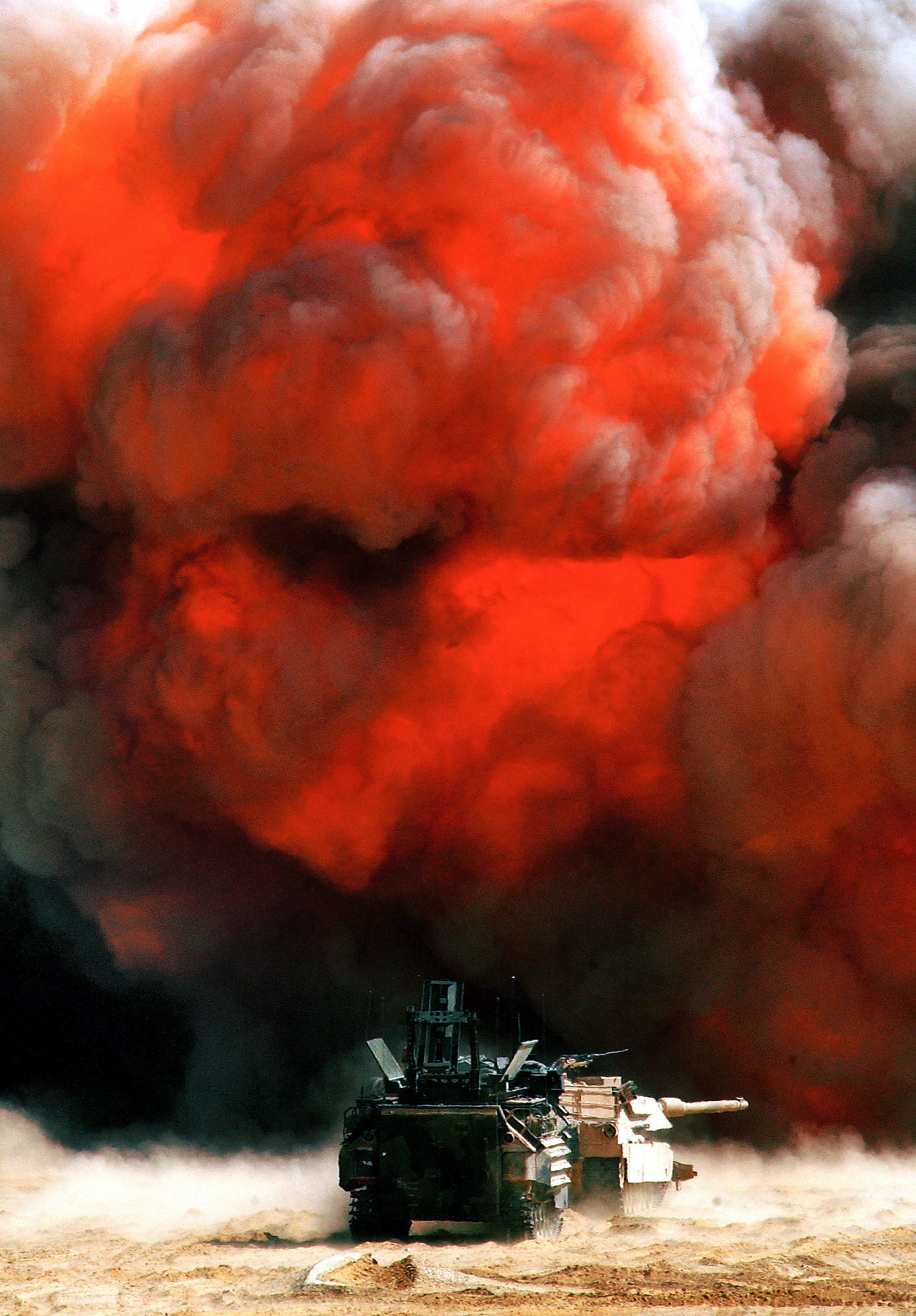
An MCLC detonation in front of two armored vehicles during Exercise Bright Star 2001

A mine-clearing line charge (abbreviated MCLC or MICLIC; pronounced /mɪk.lɪk/ or "mick-lick") is a device used to create a breach in minefields under combat conditions. While there are many types, the basic design is for many explosive charges connected on a line to be projected onto the minefield and then exploded, detonating any buried mines, thus clearing a path for troops to cross.

The system may either be human-portable or vehicle-mounted. Man-portable MCLCs are primarily used to clear smaller paths for dismounted infantry while the larger vehicle mounted are used to clear paths for combat vehicles. The systems do not guarantee clearance of all types of mines.

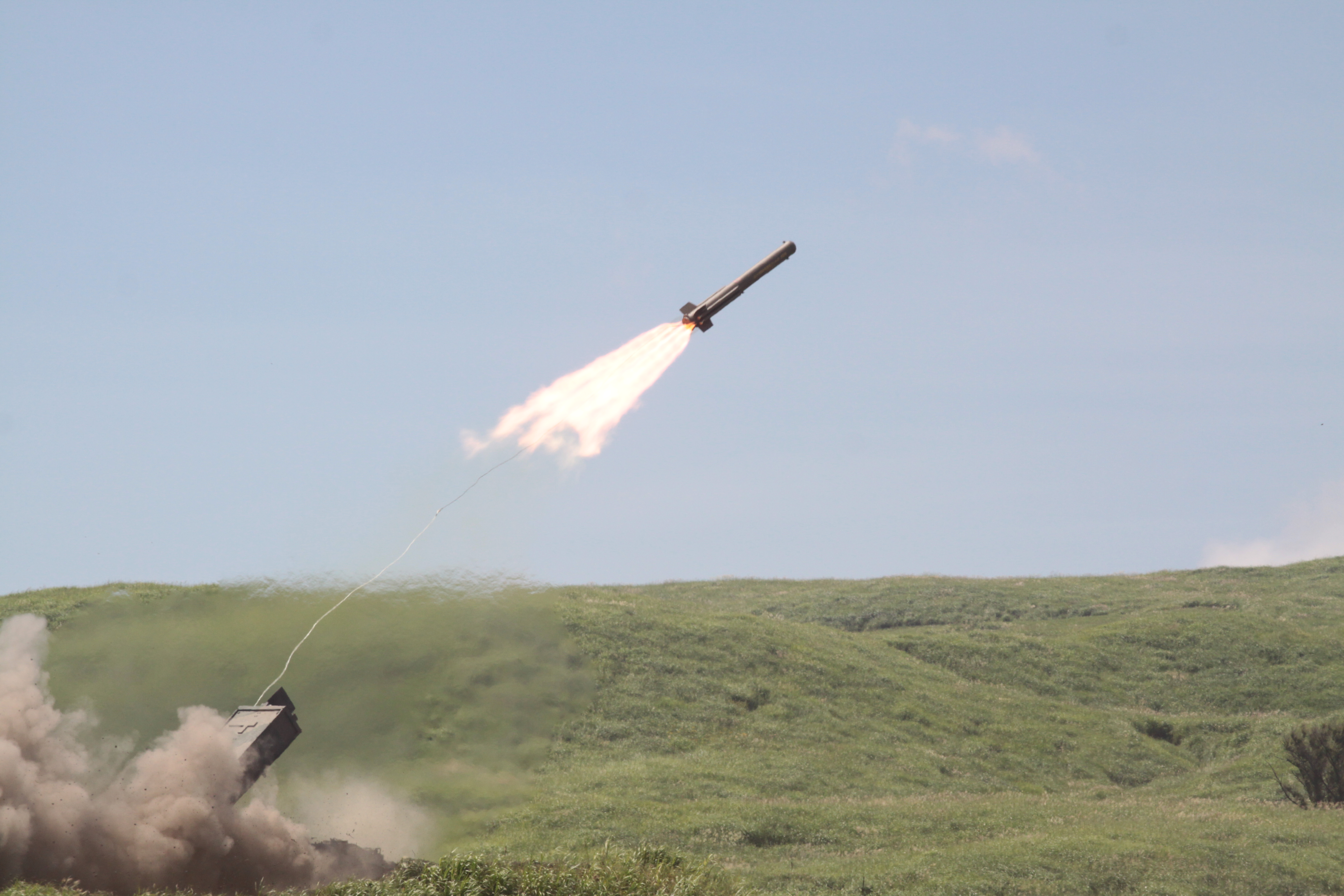
Japanese MCLC launch

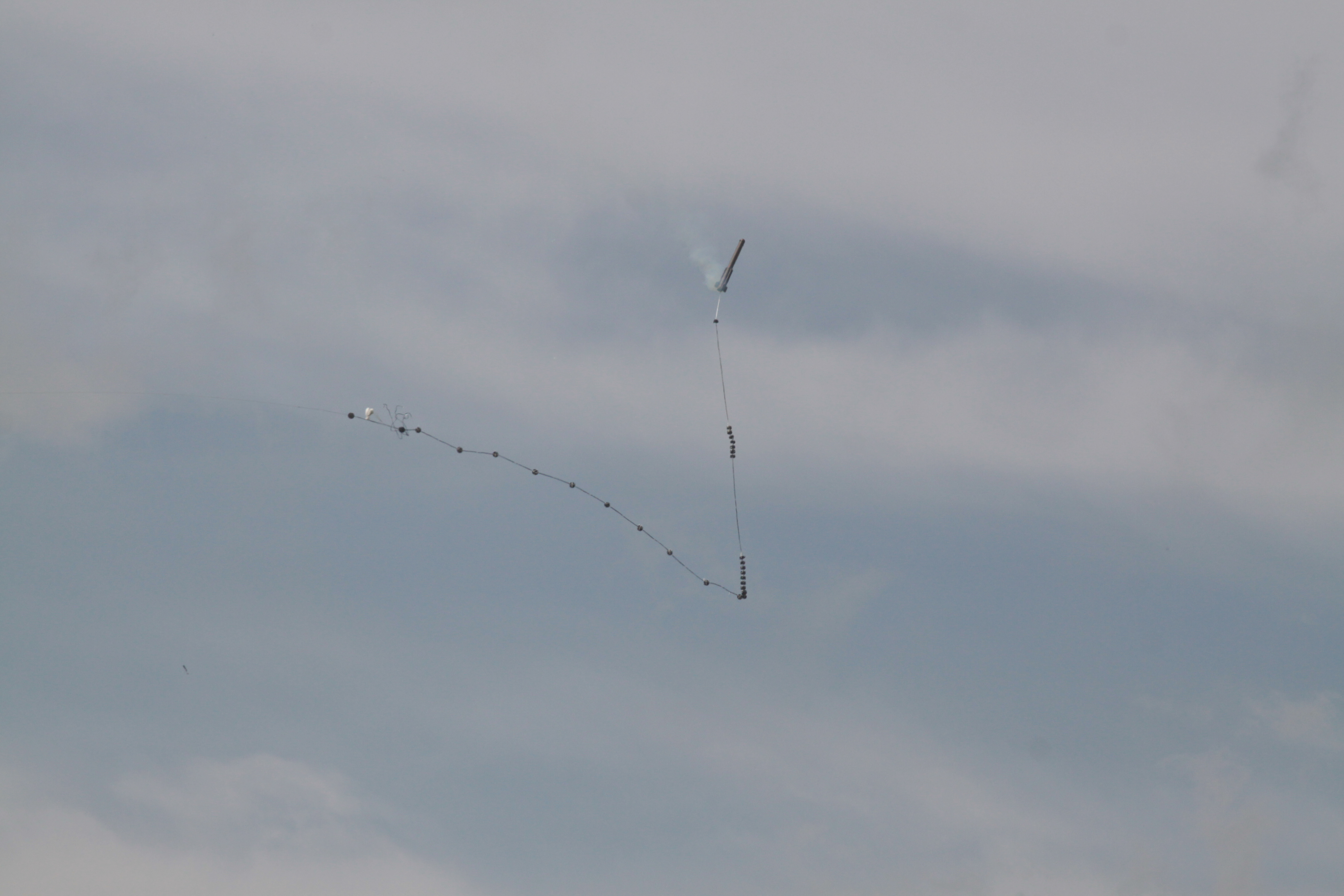
Line charges deploying in air

== History ==
The British and Commonwealth developed their systems during the Second World War. The Canadians developed "Snake", an oversized application of the Bangalore torpedo in 1941 to 1942. A more flexible development was "Conger", developed in 1944, a tube that could be fired across the minefield and then filled with explosive before detonation.

Conger was a 2-inch (51 mm) woven hose launched by a five-inch (127 mm) rocket. The tube and rocket were mounted in a Universal Carrier which had been stripped out to reduce it down to an armoured tracked trailer that could be towed by a tank, often a Churchill AVRE. The rocket was fired, trailing the hose across the area to be cleared. Compressed air was then used to pump the liquid explosive – just over a ton of "822C" nitroglycerin – into the hose before it was detonated. Conger was used in Normandy where there were instances of premature detonation. In October 1944 a Conger prematurely exploded in Ijzendijke, the Netherlands, killing 57 British and Canadian Soldiers.

In the 1950s the British introduced Giant Viper towed MICLIC.

In 1991, during the First Gulf War (a.k.a. the Persian Gulf War) MICLICs, such as the Giant Viper, consisted of rocket launched lines containing roughly 800 kilograms of explosives, stretching some 100 meters long. These MICLICs were used by Coalition forces to penetrate extensive Iraqi minefield along the Saudi-Kuwait border.

During the South African Border War, South African forces employed the use of the Plofadder system to clear paths through Angolan and Cuban minefields.

== Current use ==
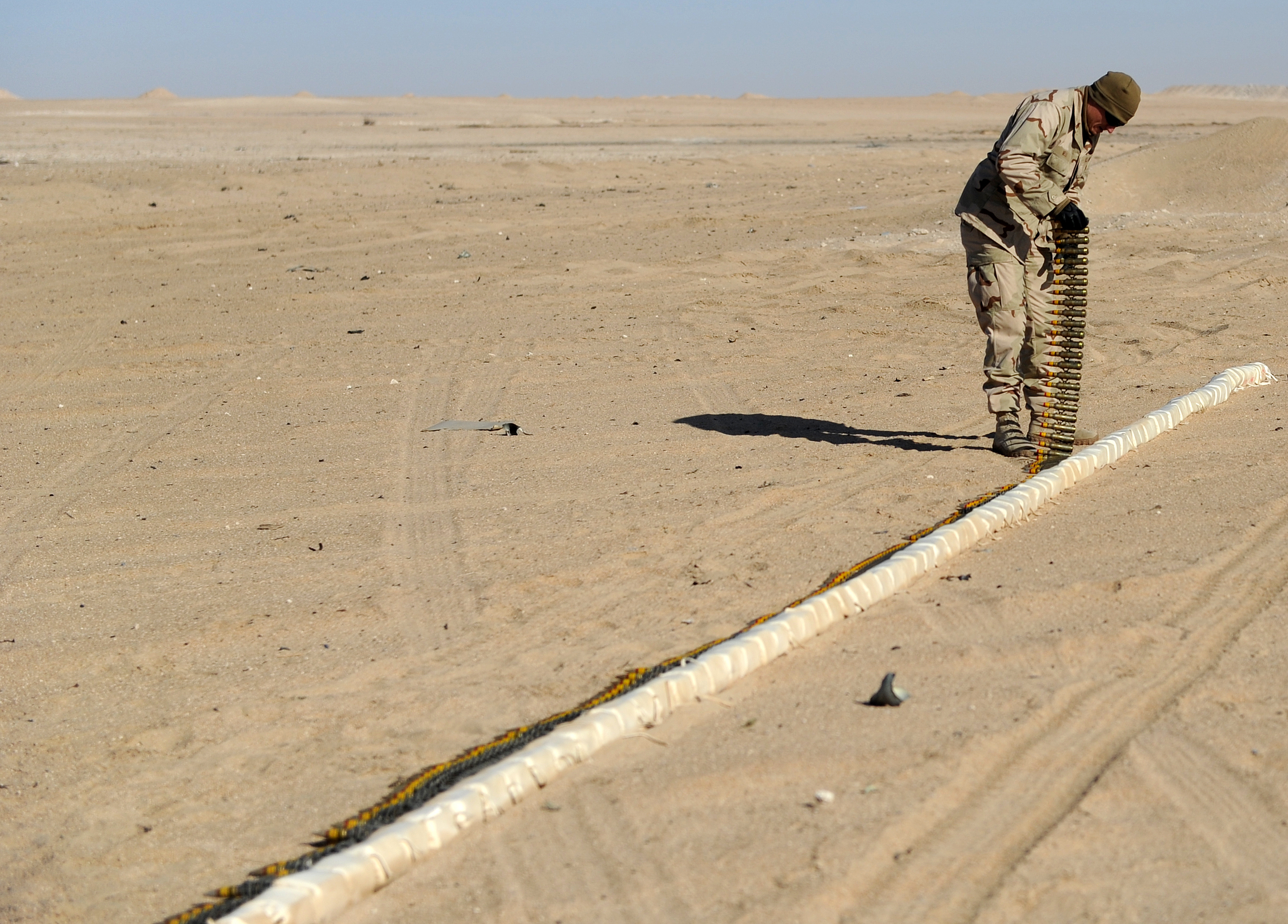
Laid out line charge being used to destroy surplus ammunition

Systems in current use include the British Python minefield breaching system, which can clear a 7.3-metre (24 ft) wide by 180–200-metre (590–660 ft) long path, and the American M58 Mine Clearing Line Charge, which can clear an 8 m wide by 100 m long path. Both are large, heavy systems that are deployed in a vehicle-towed trailer.

The US Army also uses the Antipersonnel Obstacle Breaching System, which clears a path 0.6 to 1.0 meters by 45 meters, and is light enough to be carried by two soldiers.

There have been reports of Russian forces using the UR-77 Meteorit MICLIC systems in Syria as offensive weapons to destroy buildings during urban fighting.

== Countermeasures ==
Some modern mines, such as the Italian SB-33 mine, have a fuze mechanism that detonates the mine if subject to gradual, steady pressure, but locks the fuze if subject to a sudden shock. Such mines are resistant to clearing by line charges.

== Examples ==
- M58 MICLIC (Mine Clearing Line Charge) vehicle
- M1150 Assault Breacher Vehicle
- Antipersonnel Obstacle Breaching System (APOBS)
- Heavy Portable Obstacle Minefield Breaching System (H-POMBS), also known as, Personnel Explosive Lane Clearing Charge (PELLC) – manufactured by Wescom Defence GmbH. A modern personnel sized version of the Giant-Viper. Purchased by the Australian Army under LAND 144.
- Python minefield breaching system
- Charge Line Mine Clearing (Vehicle) – Indian
- UR-77 Soviet Meteorit Mineclearing System (rocket launched explosive hose), replacement of the UR-67 system based on the BTR-50PK chassis.
- Turkish MKE TAMGEÇ and MKE TAMKAR. Tracked with FNSS ACV-15 mounted on trailer.
- Japanese Type-70 Minefield Clearing Device and Type-92 Minefield Breaching Rocket System (MBRS)

== See also ==
- Bangalore torpedo
- Canadian pipe mine
