= Python minefield breaching system =

British Army vehicle

The Python minefield breaching system is used by the British Army to clear minefields. It replaces the Giant Viper, and has the ability to clear a safe lane in minefields 180–200 m long and 7.3 m-wide (24 ft) through which vehicles can pass.

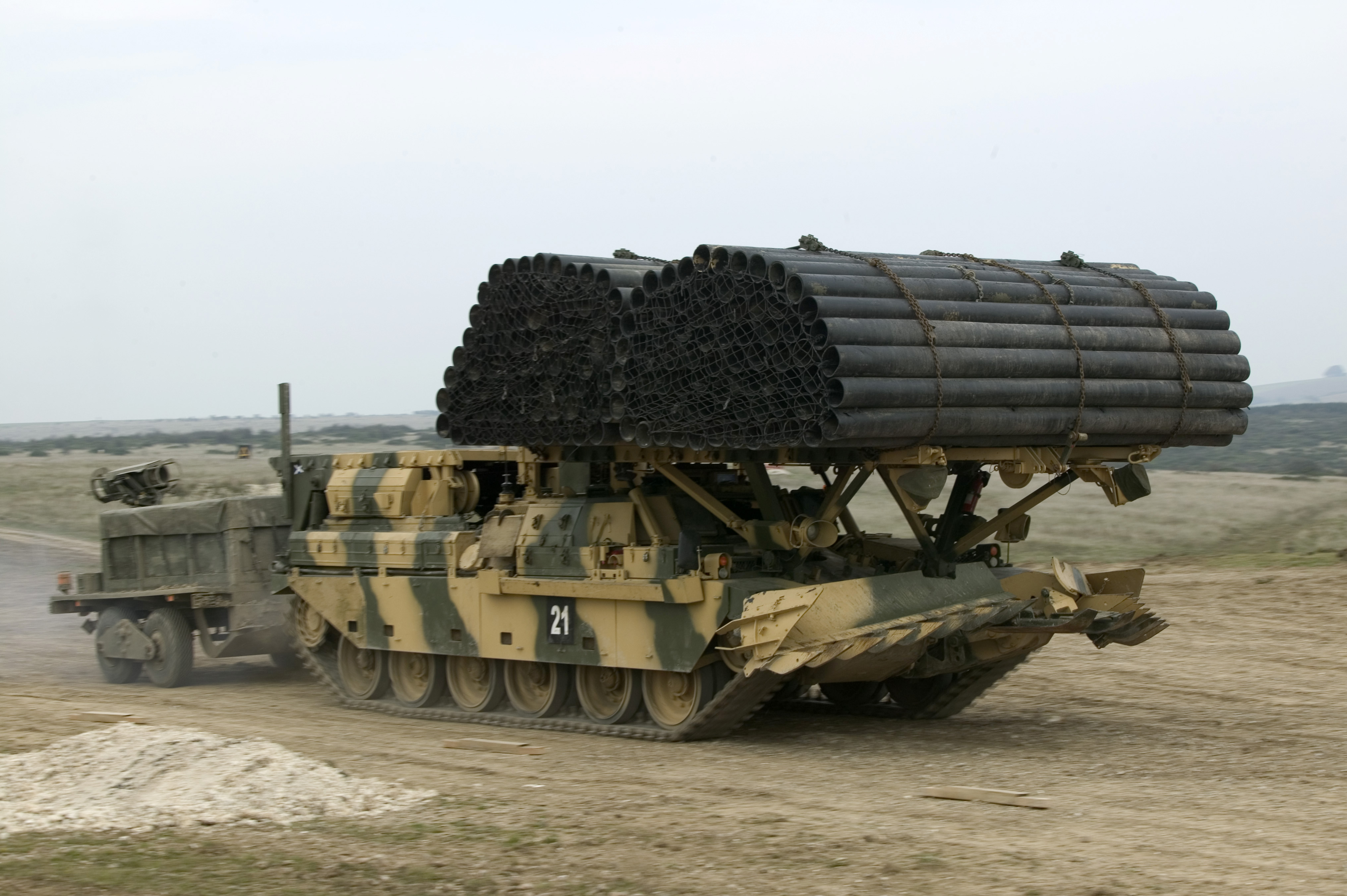
A Chieftain AVRE carrying fascines and towing Python on Salisbury Plain. The AVRE is fitted with a mine plough, used when time permits, to safely move out of the way any mines missed by Python

The system works by firing a single rocket from a launcher mounted on a 136-kilogramme trailer which has to be towed to the edge of the mined area. Attached to the rocket motor 250 mm L9 53 kg is a 228 m-long (748 ft) hose packed with 1455 kg of pe6/al explosive. After the hose lands on the ground it detonates and destroys over 90% of mines along its entire length. The 10% that are not destroyed are simply pushed aside to safety. It can be used in tandem to defeat double impulse mines or mines of greater depth. It also contains a 9 kg high-explosive substitute at the end with a .9 kg booster of pe4.

Python has been used operationally with the Trojan AVRE in Afghanistan. During Operation Moshtarak the Royal Engineers attempted to use this traditional mine clearance equipment in the Counter-IED role in support of a major British Army advance.

== See also ==
- Mine-clearing line charge
