= Giant Viper =

Rocket-launched mine clearance system

The Giant Viper was a trailer-mounted, vehicle-pulled, mine clearance system, designed to be deployed in areas containing land mines. It was developed for the British Army in the 1950s. It was designed to be towed behind a Centurion gun tank, FV4003, AVRE (Armoured Vehicle Royal Engineers); and also the FV432 Armoured personnel carrier.

The Giant Viper used rockets to launch a 250-metre-long hose, packed with plastic explosive, across a minefield. In the 1970s, the Giant Viper hoses were filled at ROF Chorley. Once it lands the charge is detonated, clearing a six-metre-wide path of anti-personnel and anti-tank mines by sympathetic detonation. This cleared path has a length of around 200 metres. For safety, a vehicle fitted with a mine plough is driven through the cleared path before any other personnel, in order to push any undetonated mines safely out of the way.

This system has been superseded by the Python minefield breaching system, employing the same methodology, but using more modern components. It improves accuracy of delivery, deployment speed, and the size of the cleared path, which is now 230 metres long and 7 meters wide. Python was designed to be towed behind an AVRE.

The Hellenic Army's Engineer Corps still utilize the system.

== See also ==
- Mine-clearing line charge
