= Ivanovsky (rural locality) =

Ivanovsky (Russian: Ивановский; masculine), Ivanovskaya (Ивановская; feminine), or Ivanovskoye (Ивановское; neuter), is the name of several rural localities in Russia.

== Modern inhabited localities ==
=== Amur Oblast ===
As of 2010, two rural localities in Amur Oblast bear this name:

- Ivanovsky, Amur Oblast, a settlement in Maysky Rural Settlement of Mazanovsky District
- Ivanovskoye, Amur Oblast, a selo in Ivanovsky Rural Settlement of Selemdzhinsky District

=== Arkhangelsk Oblast ===
As of 2010, ten rural localities in Arkhangelsk Oblast bear this name:

- Ivanovskoye, Arkhangelsk Oblast, a selo in Verkhopadengsky Selsoviet of Shenkursky District
- Ivanovskaya, Koryazhemsky Selsoviet, Kotlassky District, Arkhangelsk Oblast, a village in Koryazhemsky Selsoviet of Kotlassky District
- Ivanovskaya, Zabelinsky Selsoviet, Kotlassky District, Arkhangelsk Oblast, a village in Zabelinsky Selsoviet of Kotlassky District
- Ivanovskaya, Krasnoborsky District, Arkhangelsk Oblast, a village in Verkhneuftyugsky Selsoviet of Krasnoborsky District
- Ivanovskaya, Nyandomsky District, Arkhangelsk Oblast, a village in Limsky Selsoviet of Nyandomsky District
- Ivanovskaya, Plesetsky District, Arkhangelsk Oblast, a village in Kenoretsky Selsoviet of Plesetsky District
- Ivanovskaya, Nikolsky Selsoviet, Shenkursky District, Arkhangelsk Oblast, a village in Nikolsky Selsoviet of Shenkursky District
- Ivanovskaya, Tarnyansky Selsoviet, Shenkursky District, Arkhangelsk Oblast, a village in Tarnyansky Selsoviet of Shenkursky District
- Ivanovskaya, Velsky District, Arkhangelsk Oblast, a village in Sudromsky Selsoviet of Velsky District
- Ivanovskaya, Vilegodsky District, Arkhangelsk Oblast, a village in Selyansky Selsoviet of Vilegodsky District

=== Astrakhan Oblast ===
As of 2010, one rural locality in Astrakhan Oblast bears this name:

- Ivanovsky, Astrakhan Oblast, a settlement in Nachalovsky Selsoviet of Privolzhsky District

=== Republic of Bashkortostan ===
As of 2010, one rural locality in the Republic of Bashkortostan bears this name:

- Ivanovsky, Republic of Bashkortostan, a settlement in Novocherkassky Selsoviet of the city of republic significance of Ufa

=== Bryansk Oblast ===
As of 2010, three rural localities in Bryansk Oblast bear this name:

- Ivanovsky, Komarichsky District, Bryansk Oblast, a settlement in Arkinsky Selsoviet of Komarichsky District
- Ivanovsky, Sevsky District, Bryansk Oblast, a settlement in Nekislitsky Selsoviet of Sevsky District
- Ivanovsky, Vygonichsky District, Bryansk Oblast, a settlement in Sosnovobolotsky Selsoviet of Vygonichsky District

=== Chelyabinsk Oblast ===
As of 2010, one rural locality in Chelyabinsk Oblast bears this name:

- Ivanovsky, Chelyabinsk Oblast, a settlement in Spassky Selsoviet of Verkhneuralsky District

=== Irkutsk Oblast ===
As of 2010, one rural locality in Irkutsk Oblast bears this name:

- Ivanovsky, Irkutsk Oblast, an area in Kuytunsky District

=== Ivanovo Oblast ===
As of 2010, one rural locality in Ivanovo Oblast bears this name:

- Ivanovskoye, Ivanovo Oblast, a selo in Privolzhsky District

=== Kaluga Oblast ===
As of 2010, nine rural localities in Kaluga Oblast bear this name:

- Ivanovsky, Kaluga Oblast, a settlement in Kirovsky District
- Ivanovskoye (Sovyaki Rural Settlement), Borovsky District, Kaluga Oblast, a village in Borovsky District; municipally, a part of Sovyaki Rural Settlement of that district
- Ivanovskoye (Krivskoye Rural Settlement), Borovsky District, Kaluga Oblast, a village in Borovsky District; municipally, a part of Krivskoye Rural Settlement of that district
- Ivanovskoye, Iznoskovsky District, Kaluga Oblast, a village in Iznoskovsky District
- Ivanovskoye, Kozelsky District, Kaluga Oblast, a selo in Kozelsky District
- Ivanovskoye, Maloyaroslavetsky District, Kaluga Oblast, a village in Maloyaroslavetsky District
- Ivanovskoye (Romanovo Rural Settlement), Medynsky District, Kaluga Oblast, a village in Medynsky District; municipally, a part of Romanovo Rural Settlement of that district
- Ivanovskoye (Glukhovo Rural Settlement), Medynsky District, Kaluga Oblast, a village in Medynsky District; municipally, a part of Glukhovo Rural Settlement of that district
- Ivanovskoye, Zhukovsky District, Kaluga Oblast, a selo in Zhukovsky District

=== Kirov Oblast ===
As of 2010, three rural localities in Kirov Oblast bear this name:

- Ivanovsky, Kirov Oblast, a pochinok in Buysky Rural Okrug of Urzhumsky District
- Ivanovskoye, Kirov Oblast, a selo under the administrative jurisdiction of the urban-type settlement of Svecha in Svechinsky District
- Ivanovskaya, Kirov Oblast, a village in Ichetovkinsky Rural Okrug of Afanasyevsky District

=== Komi Republic ===
As of 2010, two rural localities in the Komi Republic bear this name:

- Ivanovskaya, Kortkerossky District, Komi Republic, a village in Bolshelug Selo Administrative Territory of Kortkerossky District
- Ivanovskaya, Priluzsky District, Komi Republic, a village in Loyma Selo Administrative Territory of Priluzsky District

=== Kostroma Oblast ===
As of 2012, eleven rural localities in Kostroma Oblast bear this name:

- Ivanovsky, Kostroma Oblast, a khutor in Shangskoye Settlement of Sharyinsky District
- Ivanovskoye, Buysky District, Kostroma Oblast, a village in Tsentralnoye Settlement of Buysky District
- Ivanovskoye, Chukhlomsky District, Kostroma Oblast, a village in Nozhkinskoye Settlement of Chukhlomsky District
- Ivanovskoye, Krasnoselsky District, Kostroma Oblast, a village in Chapayevskoye Settlement of Krasnoselsky District
- Ivanovskoye, Knyazhevskoye Settlement, Makaryevsky District, Kostroma Oblast, a village in Knyazhevskoye Settlement of Makaryevsky District
- Ivanovskoye, Shemyatinskoye Settlement, Makaryevsky District, Kostroma Oblast, a village in Shemyatinskoye Settlement of Makaryevsky District
- Ivanovskoye, Manturovsky District, Kostroma Oblast, a village in Rogovskoye Settlement of Manturovsky District
- Ivanovskoye, Mezhevskoy District, Kostroma Oblast, a village in Georgiyevskoye Settlement of Mezhevskoy District
- Ivanovskoye, Nerekhtsky District, Kostroma Oblast, a selo in Yemsnenskoye Settlement of Nerekhtsky District
- Ivanovskoye, Neysky District, Kostroma Oblast, a village in Vozherovskoye Settlement of Neysky District
- Ivanovskoye, Sharyinsky District, Kostroma Oblast, a village in Ivanovskoye Settlement of Sharyinsky District

=== Krasnodar Krai ===
As of 2010, two rural localities in Krasnodar Krai bear this name:

- Ivanovsky, Krasnodar Krai, a khutor in Verkhnekubansky Rural Okrug of Novokubansky District
- Ivanovskaya, Krasnodar Krai, a stanitsa in Ivanovsky Rural Okrug of Krasnoarmeysky District

=== Kursk Oblast ===
As of 2010, five rural localities in Kursk Oblast bear this name:

- Ivanovsky, Belovsky District, Kursk Oblast, a khutor in Bobravsky Selsoviet of Belovsky District
- Ivanovsky, Dmitriyevsky District, Kursk Oblast, a settlement in Melovsky Selsoviet of Dmitriyevsky District
- Ivanovsky, Fatezhsky District, Kursk Oblast, a khutor in Kolychevsky Selsoviet of Fatezhsky District
- Ivanovsky, Zheleznogorsky District, Kursk Oblast, a settlement in Volkovsky Selsoviet of Zheleznogorsky District
- Ivanovskoye, Kursk Oblast, a selo in Ivanovsky Selsoviet of Rylsky District

=== Leningrad Oblast ===
As of 2010, seven rural localities in Leningrad Oblast bear this name:

- Ivanovskoye, Boksitogorsky District, Leningrad Oblast, a village in Zaboryevskoye Settlement Municipal Formation of Boksitogorsky District
- Ivanovskoye, Kingiseppsky District, Leningrad Oblast, a logging depot settlement in Pustomerzhskoye Settlement Municipal Formation of Kingiseppsky District
- Ivanovskoye, Lomonosovsky District, Leningrad Oblast, a village in Koporskoye Settlement Municipal Formation of Lomonosovsky District
- Ivanovskoye, Luzhsky District, Leningrad Oblast, a village in Volodarskoye Settlement Municipal Formation of Luzhsky District
- Ivanovskoye, Tikhvinsky District, Leningrad Oblast, a village in Shugozerskoye Settlement Municipal Formation of Tikhvinsky District
- Ivanovskoye, Tosnensky District, Leningrad Oblast, a village under the administrative jurisdiction of Lyubanskoye Settlement Municipal Formation of Tosnensky District
- Ivanovskoye, Volosovsky District, Leningrad Oblast, a village in Begunitskoye Settlement Municipal Formation of Volosovsky District

=== Moscow Oblast ===
As of 2010, twenty-one rural localities in Moscow Oblast bear this name:

- Ivanovskoye, Chernogolovka, Moscow Oblast, a selo under the administrative jurisdiction of the Chernogolovka City Under Oblast Jurisdiction
- Ivanovskoye, Chekhovsky District, Moscow Oblast, a selo in Stremilovskoye Rural Settlement of Chekhovsky District
- Ivanovskoye, Bolsherogachevskoye Rural Settlement, Dmitrovsky District, Moscow Oblast, a selo in Bolsherogachevskoye Rural Settlement of Dmitrovsky District
- Ivanovskoye, Kostinskoye Rural Settlement, Dmitrovsky District, Moscow Oblast, a village in Kostinskoye Rural Settlement of Dmitrovsky District
- Ivanovskoye, Ivanovskoye Rural Settlement, Istrinsky District, Moscow Oblast, a village in Ivanovskoye Rural Settlement of Istrinsky District
- Ivanovskoye, Pavlo-Slobodskoye Rural Settlement, Istrinsky District, Moscow Oblast, a village in Pavlo-Slobodskoye Rural Settlement of Istrinsky District
- Ivanovskoye, Yermolinskoye Rural Settlement, Istrinsky District, Moscow Oblast, a village in Yermolinskoye Rural Settlement of Istrinsky District
- Ivanovskoye, Nudolskoye Rural Settlement, Klinsky District, Moscow Oblast, a selo in Nudolskoye Rural Settlement of Klinsky District
- Ivanovskoye, Petrovskoye Rural Settlement, Klinsky District, Moscow Oblast, a village in Petrovskoye Rural Settlement of Klinsky District
- Ivanovskoye, Krasnogorsky District, Moscow Oblast, a village under the administrative jurisdiction of the Town of Krasnogorsk in Krasnogorsky District
- Ivanovskoye, Lotoshinsky District, Moscow Oblast, a village under the administrative jurisdiction of the work settlement of Lotoshino in Lotoshinsky District
- Ivanovskoye, Naro-Fominsky District, Moscow Oblast, a village in Pervomayskoye Rural Settlement of Naro-Fominsky District
- Ivanovskoye, Serpukhovsky District, Moscow Oblast, a village in Vasilyevskoye Rural Settlement of Serpukhovsky District
- Ivanovskoye, Shakhovskoy District, Moscow Oblast, a village in Stepankovskoye Rural Settlement of Shakhovskoy District
- Ivanovskoye, Semenovskoye Rural Settlement, Stupinsky District, Moscow Oblast, a selo in Semenovskoye Rural Settlement of Stupinsky District
- Ivanovskoye, Zhilyovo, Stupinsky District, Moscow Oblast, a village under the administrative jurisdiction of the work settlement of Zhilyovo in Stupinsky District
- Ivanovskoye, Spasskoye Rural Settlement, Volokolamsky District, Moscow Oblast, a village in Spasskoye Rural Settlement of Volokolamsky District
- Ivanovskoye, Volokolamsk, Volokolamsky District, Moscow Oblast, a selo under the administrative jurisdiction of the Town of Volokolamsk in Volokolamsky District
- Ivanovskaya, Dmitrovskoye Rural Settlement, Shatursky District, Moscow Oblast, a village in Dmitrovskoye Rural Settlement of Shatursky District
- Ivanovskaya, Krivandinskoye Rural Settlement, Shatursky District, Moscow Oblast, a village in Krivandinskoye Rural Settlement of Shatursky District
- Ivanovskaya, Yegoryevsky District, Moscow Oblast, a village under the administrative jurisdiction of the Town of Yegoryevsk in Yegoryevsky District

=== Nizhny Novgorod Oblast ===
As of 2010, eleven rural localities in Nizhny Novgorod Oblast bear this name:

- Ivanovsky, Nizhny Novgorod Oblast, a settlement in Ilyino-Zaborsky Selsoviet of the town of oblast significance of Semyonov
- Ivanovskoye, Krasnoslobodsky Selsoviet, Bor, Nizhny Novgorod Oblast, a village in Krasnoslobodsky Selsoviet of the city of oblast significance of Bor
- Ivanovskoye, Lindovsky Selsoviet, Bor, Nizhny Novgorod Oblast, a village in Lindovsky Selsoviet of the city of oblast significance of Bor
- Ivanovskoye, Yamnovsky Selsoviet, Bor, Nizhny Novgorod Oblast, a selo in Yamnovsky Selsoviet of the city of oblast significance of Bor
- Ivanovskoye, Semyonov, Nizhny Novgorod Oblast, a village in Ivanovsky Selsoviet of the town of oblast significance of Semyonov
- Ivanovskoye, Shakhunya, Nizhny Novgorod Oblast, a village in Khmelevitsky Selsoviet of the town of oblast significance of Shakhunya
- Ivanovskoye, Bogorodsky District, Nizhny Novgorod Oblast, a selo in Khvoshchevsky Selsoviet of Bogorodsky District
- Ivanovskoye, Bolshemurashkinsky District, Nizhny Novgorod Oblast, a selo in Kholyazinsky Selsoviet of Bolshemurashkinsky District
- Ivanovskoye, Diveyevsky District, Nizhny Novgorod Oblast, a selo in Ivanovsky Selsoviet of Diveyevsky District
- Ivanovskoye, Krasnobakovsky District, Nizhny Novgorod Oblast, a village in Prudovsky Selsoviet of Krasnobakovsky District
- Ivanovskoye, Spassky District, Nizhny Novgorod Oblast, a selo in Krasnovatrassky Selsoviet of Spassky District

=== Novgorod Oblast ===
As of 2010, five rural localities in Novgorod Oblast bear this name:

- Ivanovskoye, Kholmsky District, Novgorod Oblast, a village in Morkhovskoye Settlement of Kholmsky District
- Ivanovskoye, Lyubytinsky District, Novgorod Oblast, a village under the administrative jurisdiction of the urban-type settlement of Nebolchi in Lyubytinsky District
- Ivanovskoye, Moshenskoy District, Novgorod Oblast, a village in Orekhovskoye Settlement of Moshenskoy District
- Ivanovskoye, Pestovsky District, Novgorod Oblast, a village in Pestovskoye Settlement of Pestovsky District
- Ivanovskoye, Starorussky District, Novgorod Oblast, a village in Ivanovskoye Settlement of Starorussky District

=== Oryol Oblast ===
As of 2010, eight rural localities in Oryol Oblast bear this name:

- Ivanovsky, Bolkhovsky District, Oryol Oblast, a settlement in Borovskoy Selsoviet of Bolkhovsky District
- Ivanovsky, Dmitrovsky District, Oryol Oblast, a settlement in Malobobrovsky Selsoviet of Dmitrovsky District
- Ivanovsky, Kromskoy District, Oryol Oblast, a settlement in Kutafinsky Selsoviet of Kromskoy District
- Ivanovsky, Mtsensky District, Oryol Oblast, a settlement in Anikanovsky Selsoviet of Mtsensky District
- Ivanovsky, Orlovsky District, Oryol Oblast, a settlement in Zhilyayevsky Selsoviet of Orlovsky District
- Ivanovsky, Znamensky District, Oryol Oblast, a settlement in Selikhovsky Selsoviet of Znamensky District
- Ivanovskoye, Orlovsky District, Oryol Oblast, a village in Stanovskoy Selsoviet of Orlovsky District
- Ivanovskoye, Znamensky District, Oryol Oblast, a village in Znamensky Selsoviet of Znamensky District

=== Penza Oblast ===
As of 2010, one rural locality in Penza Oblast bears this name:

- Ivanovsky, Penza Oblast, a settlement in Kirovsky Selsoviet of Serdobsky District

=== Perm Krai ===
As of 2010, two rural localities in Perm Krai bear this name:

- Ivanovskoye, Perm Krai, a selo in Ilyinsky District
- Ivanovskaya, Perm Krai, a village in Yurlinsky District

=== Pskov Oblast ===
As of 2010, one rural locality in Pskov Oblast bears this name:

- Ivanovskoye, Pskov Oblast, a village in Plyussky District

=== Rostov Oblast ===
As of 2010, two rural localities in Rostov Oblast bear this name:

- Ivanovsky, Milyutinsky District, Rostov Oblast, a khutor in Nikolo-Berezovskoye Rural Settlement of Milyutinsky District
- Ivanovsky, Zimovnikovsky District, Rostov Oblast, a khutor in Severnoye Rural Settlement of Zimovnikovsky District

=== Ryazan Oblast ===
As of 2010, one rural locality in Ryazan Oblast bears this name:

- Ivanovskoye, Ryazan Oblast, a selo in Ivanovsky Rural Okrug of Starozhilovsky District

=== Saratov Oblast ===
As of 2010, two rural localities in Saratov Oblast bear this name:

- Ivanovsky, Ozinsky District, Saratov Oblast, a khutor in Ozinsky District
- Ivanovsky, Saratovsky District, Saratov Oblast, a settlement in Saratovsky District

=== Smolensk Oblast ===
As of 2010, eight rural localities in Smolensk Oblast bear this name:

- Ivanovskoye, Dorogobuzhsky District, Smolensk Oblast, a village in Frunzenskoye Rural Settlement of Dorogobuzhsky District
- Ivanovskoye, Gagarinsky District, Smolensk Oblast, a village in Tokarevskoye Rural Settlement of Gagarinsky District
- Ivanovskoye, Dneprovskoye Rural Settlement, Novoduginsky District, Smolensk Oblast, a village in Dneprovskoye Rural Settlement of Novoduginsky District
- Ivanovskoye, Izvekovskoye Rural Settlement, Novoduginsky District, Smolensk Oblast, a village in Izvekovskoye Rural Settlement of Novoduginsky District
- Ivanovskoye, Pochinkovsky District, Smolensk Oblast, a village in Ivanovskoye Rural Settlement of Pochinkovsky District
- Ivanovskoye, Astapkovichskoye Rural Settlement, Roslavlsky District, Smolensk Oblast, a village in Astapkovichskoye Rural Settlement of Roslavlsky District
- Ivanovskoye, Ivanovskoye Rural Settlement, Roslavlsky District, Smolensk Oblast, a village in Ivanovskoye Rural Settlement of Roslavlsky District
- Ivanovskoye, Tyomkinsky District, Smolensk Oblast, a village in Medvedevskoye Rural Settlement of Tyomkinsky District

=== Stavropol Krai ===
As of 2010, one rural locality in Stavropol Krai bears this name:

- Ivanovskoye, Stavropol Krai, a selo in Ivanovsky Selsoviet of Kochubeyevsky District

=== Tambov Oblast ===
As of 2010, one rural locality in Tambov Oblast bears this name:

- Ivanovsky, Tambov Oblast, a settlement in Mitropolsky Selsoviet of Bondarsky District

=== Republic of Tatarstan ===
As of 2010, three rural localities in the Republic of Tatarstan bear this name:

- Ivanovsky, Republic of Tatarstan, a settlement in Alexeyevsky District
- Ivanovskoye, Verkhneuslonsky District, Republic of Tatarstan, a settlement in Verkhneuslonsky District
- Ivanovskoye, Zelenodolsky District, Republic of Tatarstan, a village in Zelenodolsky District

=== Tula Oblast ===
As of 2010, seven rural localities in Tula Oblast bear this name:

- Ivanovsky, Tula Oblast, a settlement in Yazykovsky Rural Okrug of Kamensky District
- Ivanovskoye, Arsenyevsky District, Tula Oblast, a selo in Astapovsky Rural Okrug of Arsenyevsky District
- Ivanovskoye, Kimovsky District, Tula Oblast, a selo in Pokrovsky Rural Okrug of Kimovsky District
- Ivanovskoye, Plavsky District, Tula Oblast, a village in Meshcherinsky Rural Okrug of Plavsky District
- Ivanovskoye, Tyoplo-Ogaryovsky District, Tula Oblast, a selo in Ivanovsky Rural Okrug of Tyoplo-Ogaryovsky District
- Ivanovskoye, Venyovsky District, Tula Oblast, a village in Belkovsky Rural Okrug of Venyovsky District
- Ivanovskoye, Zaoksky District, Tula Oblast, a village in Dmitriyevsky Rural Okrug of Zaoksky District

=== Tver Oblast ===
As of 2010, fifteen rural localities in Tver Oblast bear this name:

- Ivanovskoye, Bezhetsky District, Tver Oblast, a village in Bezhetsky District
- Ivanovskoye (Mednovskoye Rural Settlement), Kalininsky District, Tver Oblast, a village in Kalininsky District; municipally, a part of Mednovskoye Rural Settlement of that district
- Ivanovskoye (Kulitskoye Rural Settlement), Kalininsky District, Tver Oblast, a village in Kalininsky District; municipally, a part of Kulitskoye Rural Settlement of that district
- Ivanovskoye, Konakovsky District, Tver Oblast, a village in Konakovsky District
- Ivanovskoye, Maksatikhinsky District, Tver Oblast, a village in Maksatikhinsky District
- Ivanovskoye, Ostashkovsky District, Tver Oblast, a village in Ostashkovsky District
- Ivanovskoye, Rameshkovsky District, Tver Oblast, a selo in Rameshkovsky District
- Ivanovskoye, Rzhevsky District, Tver Oblast, a village in Rzhevsky District
- Ivanovskoye, Sonkovsky District, Tver Oblast, two villages in Sonkovsky District
- Ivanovskoye (selo), Staritsky District, Tver Oblast, a selo in Staritsky District
- Ivanovskoye (village), Staritsky District, Tver Oblast, a village in Staritsky District
- Ivanovskoye, Toropetsky District, Tver Oblast, a village in Toropetsky District
- Ivanovskoye, Udomelsky District, Tver Oblast, a village in Udomelsky District
- Ivanovskoye, Zubtsovsky District, Tver Oblast, a village in Zubtsovsky District

=== Ulyanovsk Oblast ===
As of 2010, one rural locality in Ulyanovsk Oblast bears this name:

- Ivanovsky, Ulyanovsk Oblast, a settlement in Ureno-Karlinsky Rural Okrug of Karsunsky District

=== Vladimir Oblast ===
As of 2010, five rural localities in Vladimir Oblast bear this name:

- Ivanovskoye (Karinskoye Rural Settlement), Alexandrovsky District, Vladimir Oblast, a village in Alexandrovsky District; municipally, a part of Karinskoye Rural Settlement of that district
- Ivanovskoye (Andreyevskoye Rural Settlement), Alexandrovsky District, Vladimir Oblast, a village in Alexandrovsky District; municipally, a part of Andreyevskoye Rural Settlement of that district
- Ivanovskoye, Suzdalsky District, Vladimir Oblast, a selo in Suzdalsky District
- Ivanovskaya, Kameshkovsky District, Vladimir Oblast, a village in Kameshkovsky District
- Ivanovskaya, Selivanovsky District, Vladimir Oblast, a village in Selivanovsky District

=== Volgograd Oblast ===
As of 2010, two rural localities in Volgograd Oblast bear this name:

- Ivanovsky, Panfilovsky Selsoviet, Novoanninsky District, Volgograd Oblast, a khutor in Panfilovsky Selsoviet of Novoanninsky District

=== Vologda Oblast ===
As of 2010, thirty-one rural localities in Vologda Oblast bear this name:

- Ivanovsky, Vologda Oblast, a settlement in Sholsky Selsoviet of Belozersky District
- Ivanovskoye, Belozersky District, Vologda Oblast, a selo in Georgiyevsky Selsoviet of Belozersky District
- Ivanovskoye, Cherepovetsky District, Vologda Oblast, a selo in Ivanovsky Selsoviet of Cherepovetsky District
- Ivanovskoye, Kaduysky District, Vologda Oblast, a village in Nikolsky Selsoviet of Kaduysky District
- Ivanovskoye, Kharovsky District, Vologda Oblast, a village in Kharovsky Selsoviet of Kharovsky District
- Ivanovskoye, Kirillovsky District, Vologda Oblast, a village in Ferapontovsky Selsoviet of Kirillovsky District
- Ivanovskoye, Sokolsky District, Vologda Oblast, a village in Pelshemsky Selsoviet of Sokolsky District
- Ivanovskoye, Tomashsky Selsoviet, Ust-Kubinsky District, Vologda Oblast, a village in Tomashsky Selsoviet of Ust-Kubinsky District
- Ivanovskoye, Ustyansky Selsoviet, Ust-Kubinsky District, Vologda Oblast, a village in Ustyansky Selsoviet of Ust-Kubinsky District
- Ivanovskoye, Zadneselsky Selsoviet, Ust-Kubinsky District, Vologda Oblast, a village in Zadneselsky Selsoviet of Ust-Kubinsky District
- Ivanovskoye, Ustyuzhensky District, Vologda Oblast, a village in Nikiforovsky Selsoviet of Ustyuzhensky District
- Ivanovskoye, Kubensky Selsoviet, Vologodsky District, Vologda Oblast, a village in Kubensky Selsoviet of Vologodsky District
- Ivanovskoye, Markovsky Selsoviet, Vologodsky District, Vologda Oblast, a village in Markovsky Selsoviet of Vologodsky District
- Ivanovskoye, Spassky Selsoviet, Vologodsky District, Vologda Oblast, a village in Spassky Selsoviet of Vologodsky District
- Ivanovskoye, Veprevsky Selsoviet, Vologodsky District, Vologda Oblast, a village in Veprevsky Selsoviet of Vologodsky District
- Ivanovskaya, Babayevsky District, Vologda Oblast, a village in Novostarinsky Selsoviet of Babayevsky District
- Ivanovskaya, Belozersky District, Vologda Oblast, a village in Georgiyevsky Selsoviet of Belozersky District
- Ivanovskaya, Kharovsky District, Vologda Oblast, a village in Ilyinsky Selsoviet of Kharovsky District
- Ivanovskaya, Nyuksensky District, Vologda Oblast, a village in Uftyugsky Selsoviet of Nyuksensky District
- Ivanovskaya, Syamzhensky District, Vologda Oblast, a village in Noginsky Selsoviet of Syamzhensky District
- Ivanovskaya, Tarnogsky District, Vologda Oblast, a village in Ilezsky Selsoviet of Tarnogsky District
- Ivanovskaya, Totemsky District, Vologda Oblast, a village in Vozhbalsky Selsoviet of Totemsky District
- Ivanovskaya, Ust-Kubinsky District, Vologda Oblast, a village in Troitsky Selsoviet of Ust-Kubinsky District
- Ivanovskaya, Vashkinsky District, Vologda Oblast, a village in Ivanovsky Selsoviet of Vashkinsky District
- Ivanovskaya, Klimushinsky Selsoviet, Verkhovazhsky District, Vologda Oblast, a village in Klimushinsky Selsoviet of Verkhovazhsky District
- Ivanovskaya, Lipetsky Selsoviet, Verkhovazhsky District, Vologda Oblast, a village in Lipetsky Selsoviet of Verkhovazhsky District
- Ivanovskaya, Nizhne-Vazhskoye Rural Settlement, Verkhovazhsky District, Vologda Oblast
- Ivanovskaya, Sibirsky Selsoviet, Verkhovazhsky District, Vologda Oblast, a village in Sibirsky Selsoviet of Verkhovazhsky District
- Ivanovskaya, Mishutinsky Selsoviet, Vozhegodsky District, Vologda Oblast, a village in Mishutinsky Selsoviet of Vozhegodsky District
- Ivanovskaya, Vozhegodsky Selsoviet, Vozhegodsky District, Vologda Oblast, a village in Vozhegodsky Selsoviet of Vozhegodsky District
- Ivanovskaya, Yuchkinsky Selsoviet, Vozhegodsky District, Vologda Oblast, a village in Yuchkinsky Selsoviet of Vozhegodsky District
- Ivanovskaya, Vytegorsky District, Vologda Oblast, a village in Semenovsky Selsoviet of Vytegorsky District

=== Voronezh Oblast ===
As of 2010, one rural locality in Voronezh Oblast bears this name:

- Ivanovsky, Voronezh Oblast, a khutor in Petropavlovskoye Rural Settlement of Ostrogozhsky District

=== Yaroslavl Oblast ===
As of 2010, forty-one rural localities in Yaroslavl Oblast bear this name:

- Ivanovskoye, Blagoveshchensky Rural Okrug, Bolsheselsky District, Yaroslavl Oblast, a village in Blagoveshchensky Rural Okrug of Bolsheselsky District
- Ivanovskoye, Chudinovsky Rural Okrug, Bolsheselsky District, Yaroslavl Oblast, a village in Chudinovsky Rural Okrug of Bolsheselsky District
- Ivanovskoye, Markovsky Rural Okrug, Bolsheselsky District, Yaroslavl Oblast, a village in Markovsky Rural Okrug of Bolsheselsky District
- Ivanovskoye, Markovsky Rural Okrug, Bolsheselsky District, Yaroslavl Oblast, a village in Markovsky Rural Okrug of Bolsheselsky District
- Ivanovskoye, Borisoglebsky District, Yaroslavl Oblast, a selo in Davydovsky Rural Okrug of Borisoglebsky District
- Ivanovskoye, Breytovsky District, Yaroslavl Oblast, a village in Sevastyantsevsky Rural Okrug of Breytovsky District
- Ivanovskoye, Danilovsky Rural Okrug, Danilovsky District, Yaroslavl Oblast, a village in Danilovsky Rural Okrug of Danilovsky District
- Ivanovskoye, Pokrovsky Rural Okrug, Danilovsky District, Yaroslavl Oblast, a village in Pokrovsky Rural Okrug of Danilovsky District
- Ivanovskoye, Ryzhikovsky Rural Okrug, Danilovsky District, Yaroslavl Oblast, a village in Ryzhikovsky Rural Okrug of Danilovsky District
- Ivanovskoye, Semlovsky Rural Okrug, Danilovsky District, Yaroslavl Oblast, a village in Semlovsky Rural Okrug of Danilovsky District
- Ivanovskoye, Osetsky Rural Okrug, Lyubimsky District, Yaroslavl Oblast, a village in Osetsky Rural Okrug of Lyubimsky District
- Ivanovskoye, Voskresensky Rural Okrug, Lyubimsky District, Yaroslavl Oblast, a village in Voskresensky Rural Okrug of Lyubimsky District
- Ivanovskoye, Myshkinsky District, Yaroslavl Oblast, a selo in Povodnevsky Rural Okrug of Myshkinsky District
- Ivanovskoye, Novinsky Rural Okrug, Nekouzsky District, Yaroslavl Oblast, a village in Novinsky Rural Okrug of Nekouzsky District
- Ivanovskoye, Rozhalovsky Rural Okrug, Nekouzsky District, Yaroslavl Oblast, a village in Rozhalovsky Rural Okrug of Nekouzsky District
- Ivanovskoye, Borovskoy Rural Okrug, Nekrasovsky District, Yaroslavl Oblast, a village in Borovskoy Rural Okrug of Nekrasovsky District
- Ivanovskoye, Nikolsky Rural Okrug, Nekrasovsky District, Yaroslavl Oblast, a village in Nikolsky Rural Okrug of Nekrasovsky District
- Ivanovskoye, Perelessky Rural Okrug, Pereslavsky District, Yaroslavl Oblast, a settlement in Perelessky Rural Okrug of Pereslavsky District
- Ivanovskoye, Ponomarevsky Rural Okrug, Pereslavsky District, Yaroslavl Oblast, a selo in Ponomarevsky Rural Okrug of Pereslavsky District
- Ivanovskoye, Kukoboysky Rural Okrug, Pervomaysky District, Yaroslavl Oblast, a village in Kukoboysky Rural Okrug of Pervomaysky District
- Ivanovskoye, Prechistensky Rural Okrug, Pervomaysky District, Yaroslavl Oblast, a village in Prechistensky Rural Okrug of Pervomaysky District
- Ivanovskoye, Uritsky Rural Okrug, Pervomaysky District, Yaroslavl Oblast, a village in Uritsky Rural Okrug of Pervomaysky District
- Ivanovskoye, Kolodinsky Rural Okrug, Poshekhonsky District, Yaroslavl Oblast, a village in Kolodinsky Rural Okrug of Poshekhonsky District
- Ivanovskoye, Sverdlovsky Rural Okrug, Poshekhonsky District, Yaroslavl Oblast, a village in Sverdlovsky Rural Okrug of Poshekhonsky District
- Ivanovskoye, Rostovsky District, Yaroslavl Oblast, a village in Shugorsky Rural Okrug of Rostovsky District
- Ivanovskoye, Arefinsky Rural Okrug, Rybinsky District, Yaroslavl Oblast, a village in Arefinsky Rural Okrug of Rybinsky District
- Ivanovskoye, Arefinsky Rural Okrug, Rybinsky District, Yaroslavl Oblast, a village in Arefinsky Rural Okrug of Rybinsky District
- Ivanovskoye, Arefinsky Rural Okrug, Rybinsky District, Yaroslavl Oblast, a village in Arefinsky Rural Okrug of Rybinsky District
- Ivanovskoye, Glebovsky Rural Okrug, Rybinsky District, Yaroslavl Oblast, a selo in Glebovsky Rural Okrug of Rybinsky District
- Ivanovskoye, Mikhaylovsky Rural Okrug, Rybinsky District, Yaroslavl Oblast, a village in Mikhaylovsky Rural Okrug of Rybinsky District
- Ivanovskoye, Nazarovsky Rural Okrug, Rybinsky District, Yaroslavl Oblast, a village in Nazarovsky Rural Okrug of Rybinsky District
- Ivanovskoye, Ogarkovsky Rural Okrug, Rybinsky District, Yaroslavl Oblast, a village in Ogarkovsky Rural Okrug of Rybinsky District
- Ivanovskoye, Pokrovsky Rural Okrug, Rybinsky District, Yaroslavl Oblast, a village in Pokrovsky Rural Okrug of Rybinsky District
- Ivanovskoye, Shashkovsky Rural Okrug, Rybinsky District, Yaroslavl Oblast, a village in Shashkovsky Rural Okrug of Rybinsky District
- Ivanovskoye, Metenininsky Rural Okrug, Tutayevsky District, Yaroslavl Oblast, a village in Metenininsky Rural Okrug of Tutayevsky District
- Ivanovskoye, Nikolsky Rural Okrug, Tutayevsky District, Yaroslavl Oblast, a village in Nikolsky Rural Okrug of Tutayevsky District
- Ivanovskoye, Pomogalovsky Rural Okrug, Tutayevsky District, Yaroslavl Oblast, a village in Pomogalovsky Rural Okrug of Tutayevsky District
- Ivanovskoye, Rodionovsky Rural Okrug, Tutayevsky District, Yaroslavl Oblast, a village in Rodionovsky Rural Okrug of Tutayevsky District
- Ivanovskoye, Vasilevsky Rural Okrug, Uglichsky District, Yaroslavl Oblast, a village in Vasilevsky Rural Okrug of Uglichsky District
- Ivanovskoye, Vozdvizhensky Rural Okrug, Uglichsky District, Yaroslavl Oblast, a village in Vozdvizhensky Rural Okrug of Uglichsky District
- Ivanovskaya, Yaroslavl Oblast, a village in Kryukovsky Rural Okrug of Myshkinsky District

== Abolished inhabited localities ==
- Ivanovskoye, Parfenyevsky District, Kostroma Oblast, a village in Savinsky Selsoviet of Parfenyevsky District in Kostroma Oblast; abolished on October 18, 2004
- Ivanovskoye, a former urban-type settlement in Leningrad Oblast, which in 1970 was merged with the urban-type settlement of Otradnoye to form the town of Otradnoye
- Ivanovsky, Novokiyevsky Selsoviet, Novoanninsky District, Volgograd Oblast, a khutor in Novokiyevsky Selsoviet of Novoanninsky District; abolished before July 2013
