= Ivanovsky =

Ivanovsky (Russian: Ивановский; masculine), Ivanovskaya (Ивановская; feminine), or Ivanovskoye (Ивановское; neuter), are forms of a Russian adjective derived from the first name Ivan. It may refer to:

- Ivanovsky (surname) (feminine: Ivanovskaya), Russian surname

== Places ==
=== Ivanovskaya ===
- Ivanovskaya, Selivanovsky District, Vladimir Oblast
- Ivanovskaya, Sibirsky Selsoviet, Verkhovazhsky District, Vologda Oblast
- Ivanovskaya, Nizhne-Vazhskoye Rural Settlement, Verkhovazhsky District, Vologda Oblast
- Ivanovskaya, Mishutinsky Selsoviet, Vozhegodsky District, Vologda Oblast
- Ivanovskaya, Vozhegodsky Selsoviet, Vozhegodsky District, Vologda Oblast
- Ivanovskaya, Tarnogsky District, Vologda Oblast
- Ivanovskaya, Lipetsky Selsoviet, Verkhovazhsky District, Vologda Oblast
- Ivanovskaya, Vashkinsky District, Vologda Oblast
- Ivanovskaya, Syamzhensky District, Vologda Oblast
- Ivanovskaya, Vytegorsky District, Vologda Oblast
- Ivanovskaya, Ust-Kubinsky District, Vologda Oblast
- Ivanovskaya, Totemsky District, Vologda Oblast
- Ivanovskaya, Nyuksensky District, Vologda Oblast
- Ivanovskaya, Perm Krai
- Ivanovskaya railway station
- Ivanovskaya Square

=== Ivanovsky ===
- Ivanovsky District, name of several districts in Russia
- Ivanovsky Municipal Okrug, a municipal okrug of Nevsky District of St. Petersburg, Russia
- Ivanovsky (rural locality) (Ivanovskaya, Ivanovskoye), name of several rural localities in Russia
- Ivanovsky Waterfall, a waterfall in Sochi National Park, Russia

=== Ivanovskoye ===
- Ivanovskoye, Amur Oblast
- Ivanovskoye, Arkhangelsk Oblast
- Ivanovskoye, Ivanovo Oblast
- Ivanovskoye, Perm Krai
- Ivanovskoye (Andreyevskoye Rural Settlement), Alexandrovsky District, Vladimir Oblast
- Ivanovskoye (Karinskoye Rural Settlement), Alexandrovsky District, Vladimir Oblast
- Ivanovskoye, Suzdalsky District, Vladimir Oblast
- Ivanovskoye, Cherepovetsky District, Vologda Oblast
- Ivanovskoye, Kaduysky District, Vologda Oblast
- Ivanovskoye, Markovsky Selsoviet, Vologodsky District, Vologda Oblast
- Ivanovskoye, Spassky Selsoviet, Vologodsky District, Vologda Oblast
- Ivanovskoye, Veprevsky Selsoviet, Vologodsky District, Vologda Oblast
- Ivanovskoye, Ustyuzhensky District, Vologda Oblast
- Ivanovskoye District, a district of Eastern Administrative Okrug, Moscow, Russia

== See also ==
- Ivanivske (disambiguation)
- Ivanovski (feminine: Ivanovska), Macedonian surname
