= Shapki =

Shapki (Russian: Ша́пки) is the name of several rural localities in Russia:

- Shapki, Kirov Oblast, a village in Yumsky Rural Okrug of Svechinsky District in Kirov Oblast; 58°15′N 47°54′E
- Shapki, Leningrad Oblast, a settlement in Shapkinskoye Settlement Municipal Formation of Tosnensky District in Leningrad Oblast
- Shapki, Smolensk Oblast, a village in Klyarinovskoye Rural Settlement of Rudnyansky District in Smolensk Oblast
