= Biryuchevskaya =

Biryuchevskaya Бирючевская
- Village
- Location within Vologda Oblast Location within Russia
- Coordinates: 60°34′N 42°38′E
- Country: Russia
- Region: Vologda Oblast
- District: Verkhovazhsky District

Population
  - Total: 21
- Time zone: UTC+3:00

Biryuchevskaya (Russian: Бирючевская) is a rural locality (a village) in Sibirskoye Rural Settlement, Verkhovazhsky District, Vologda Oblast, Russia. The population was 21 as of 2002.

== Geography ==
Biryuchevskaya is located 48 km southeast of Verkhovazhye (the district's administrative centre) by road. Ivanovskaya is the nearest rural locality.
