= Ediacaran =

Third and last period of the Neoproterozoic Era

- 635 – 538.8 ± 0.6 Ma
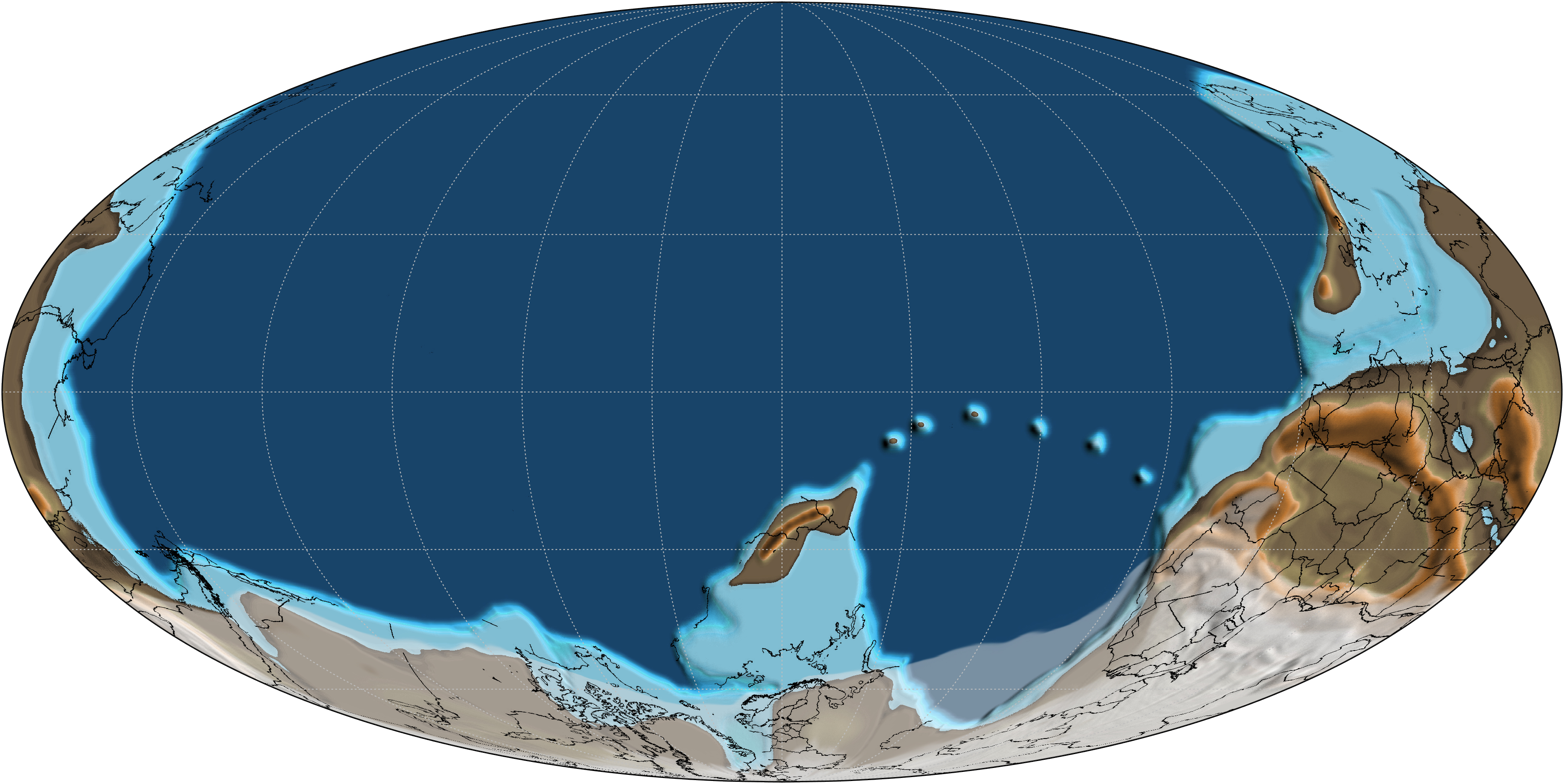
- A map of Earth as it appeared during the mid-Ediacaran, c. 600 Ma

Chronology
← / Marinoan glaciation; ← / Lantian biota appears; ← / Palaeopascichnids; ← / Gaskiers glaciation; ← / Baykonurian glaciation; ← / Treptichnus pedum
Major glacial period
Events of the Ediacaran Period; Vertical axis scale: millions of years ago

Etymology
- Name formality: Formal
- Name ratified: 1990

Usage information
- Celestial body: Earth
- Regional usage: Global (ICS)
- Time scale(s) used: ICS Time Scale

Definition
- Chronological unit: Period
- Stratigraphic unit: System
- Time span formality: Formal
- Lower boundary definition: Worldwide distinct cap carbonates.; Beginning of a distinctive pattern of secular changes in carbon isotopes.
- Lower boundary GSSP: Enorama Creek section, Flinders Ranges, South Australia; 31.3314°S 138.6334°E
- Lower GSSP ratified: March 12, 2004
- Upper boundary definition: Appearance of the Ichnofossil Treptichnus pedum
- Upper boundary GSSP: Fortune Head section, Newfoundland, Canada; 47.0762°N 55.8310°W
- Upper GSSP ratified: August 1992 (as base of Cambrian)

Atmospheric and climatic data
- Mean atmospheric O_{2} content: c. 8 vol % (40% of modern)
- Mean atmospheric CO_{2} content: c. 4500 ppm (16 times pre-industrial)
- Mean surface temperature: c. 17 °C (3.5 °C above pre-industrial)

The Ediacaran ( /ˌiːdiˈækərən, ˌɛdi-/ EE-dee-AK-ər-ən, ED-ee-) is a geological period of the Neoproterozoic Era that spans 96 million years from the end of the Cryogenian Period 635 million years ago to the beginning of the Cambrian Period 538.8 million years ago. It is the last period of the Proterozoic Eon as well as the last of the so-called "Precambrian supereon", before the beginning of the subsequent Cambrian Period marks the start of the Phanerozoic Eon, where recognizable fossil evidence of life becomes common.

The Ediacaran Period is named after the Ediacara Hills of South Australia, where trace fossils of a diverse community of previously unrecognized lifeforms (later named the Ediacaran biota) were first discovered by geologist Reg Sprigg in 1946. Its status as an official geological period was ratified in 2004 by the International Union of Geological Sciences (IUGS), making it the first new geological period declared in 120 years. Although the period took namesake from the Ediacara Hills in the Nilpena Ediacara National Park, the type section is actually located in the bed of the Enorama Creek within the Brachina Gorge in the Ikara-Flinders Ranges National Park, at 31°19′53.8″S 138°38′0.1″E, approximately 55 km (34 mi) southeast of the Ediacara Hills fossil site.

The Ediacaran marks the first widespread appearance of complex multicellular fauna following the end of the Cryogenian global glaciation known as the Snowball Earth. The relatively sudden evolutionary radiation event, known as the Avalon Explosion, is represented by now-extinct, relatively simple soft-bodied animal phyla such as Proarticulata (bilaterians with simple articulation, e.g. Dickinsonia and Spriggina), Petalonamae (sea pen-like animals, e.g. Charnia), Aspidella (radial-shaped animals, e.g. Cyclomedusa) and Trilobozoa (animals with tri-radial symmetry, e.g. Tribrachidium). Most of these organisms appeared during or after the Avalon explosion 575 million years ago and died out during the End-Ediacaran extinction event 539 million years ago. Forerunners of some modern animal phyla also appeared during this period, including cnidarians and early bilaterians, as well as mollusc-like Kimberella. Hard-bodied organisms with mineralized shells also began their fossil record in the last few million years of the Ediacaran.

The supercontinent Pannotia formed and broke apart by the end of the period. The Ediacaran also witnessed several glaciation events, such as the Gaskiers and Baykonurian glaciations. The Shuram excursion also occurred during this period, but its glacial origin is unlikely.

== Ediacaran vs. Vendian ==
The Ediacaran Period overlaps but is shorter than the Vendian Period (650 to 543 million years ago), a name that was earlier, in 1952, proposed by Russian geologist and paleontologist Boris Sokolov. The Vendian concept was formed stratigraphically top-down, and the lower boundary of the Cambrian became the upper boundary of the Vendian.

Paleontological substantiation of this boundary was worked out separately for the siliciclastic basin (base of the Baltic Stage of the Eastern European Platform) and for the carbonate basin (base of the Tommotian stage of the Siberian Platform). The lower boundary of the Vendian was suggested to be defined at the base of the Varanger (Laplandian stage) tillites.

The Vendian in its type area consists of large subdivisions such as Laplandian, Redkino, Kotlin, and Rovno regional stages with the globally traceable subdivisions and their boundaries, including its lower one.

The Redkino, Kotlin and Rovno regional stages have been substantiated in the type area of the Vendian on the basis of the abundant organic-walled microfossils, megascopic algae, metazoan body fossils and ichnofossils.

The lower boundary of the Vendian could have a biostratigraphic substantiation as well taking into consideration the worldwide occurrence of the Pertatataka assemblage of giant acanthomorph acritarchs.

== Upper and lower boundaries ==
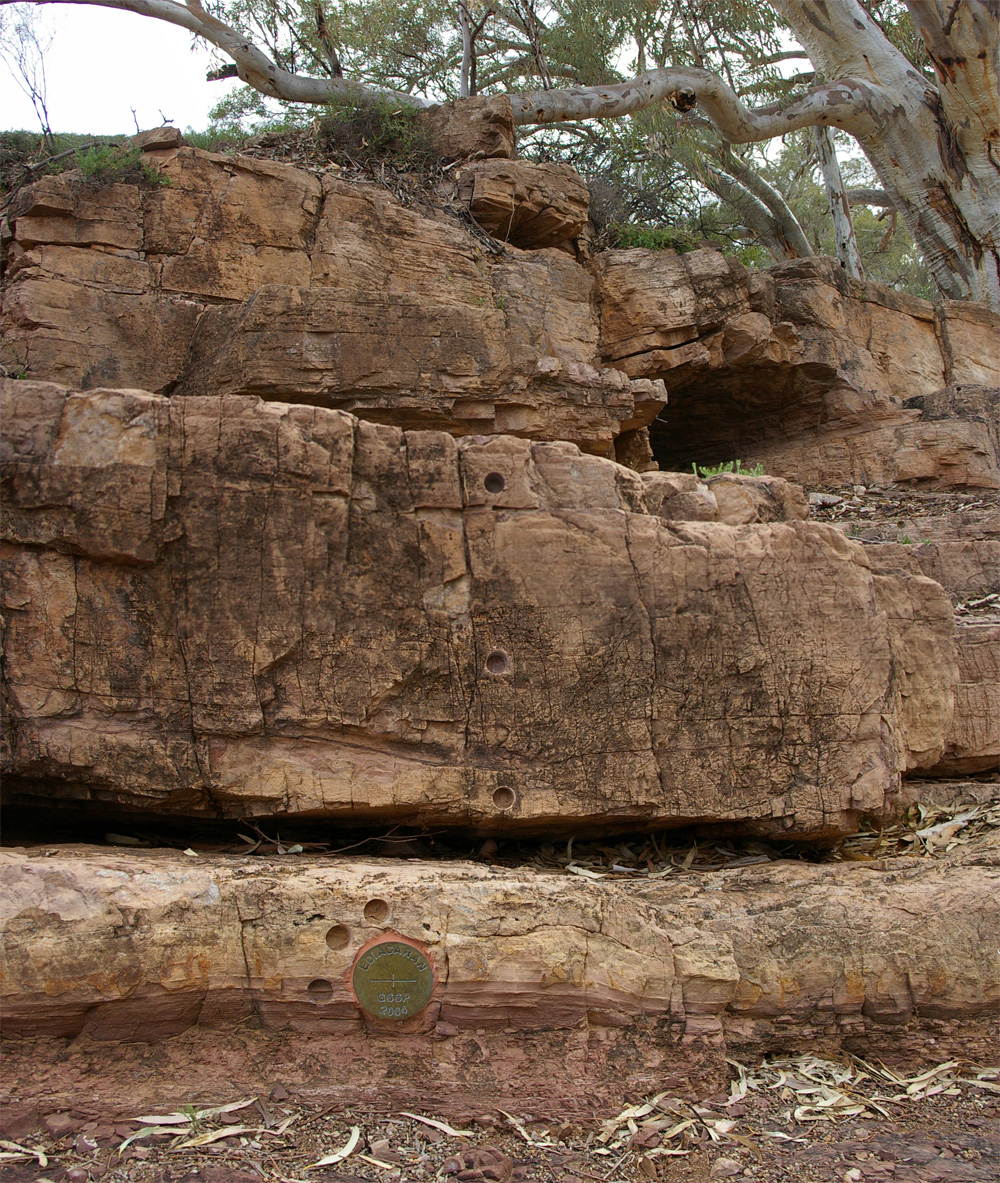
The 'golden spike' (bronze disk in the lower section of the image) or 'type section' of the Global Boundary Stratotype Section and Point (GSSP) for the base of the Ediacaran System

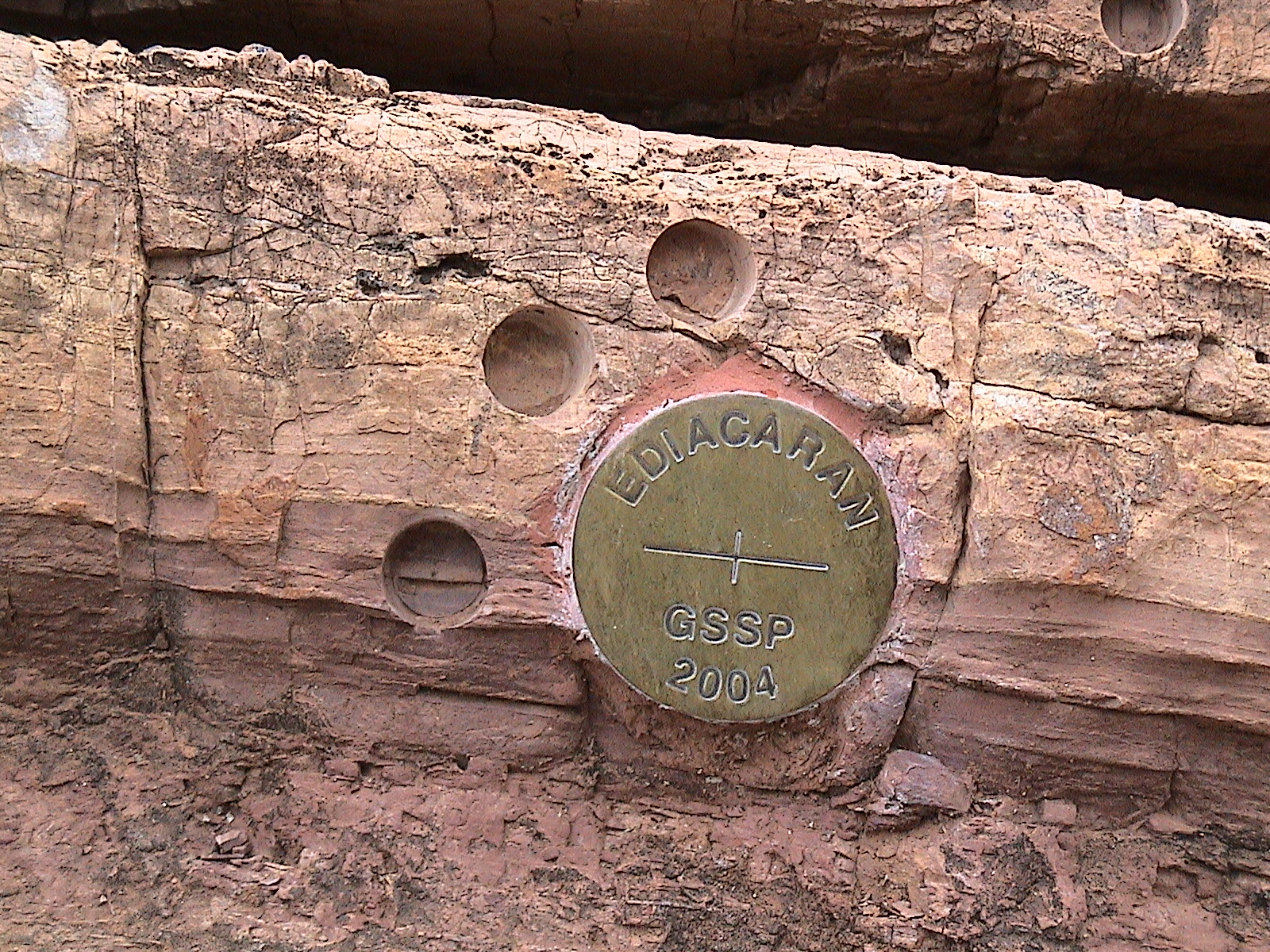
The 'golden spike' marking the GSSP

The Ediacaran Period represents the time from the end of global Marinoan glaciation to the first appearance worldwide of somewhat complicated trace fossils (Treptichnus pedum (Seilacher, 1955)).

Although the Ediacaran Period does contain soft-bodied fossils, it is unusual in comparison to later periods because its beginning is not defined by a change in the fossil record. Rather, the beginning is defined at the base of a chemically distinctive carbonate layer that is referred to as a "cap carbonate", because it caps glacial deposits.

This bed is characterized by an unusual depletion of ^{13}C that indicates a sudden climatic change at the end of the Marinoan ice age. The lower global boundary stratotype section (GSSP) of the Ediacaran is at the base of the cap carbonate (Nuccaleena Formation), immediately above the Elatina diamictite in the Enorama Creek section, Brachina Gorge, within the Ikara–Flinders Ranges National Park, Flinders Ranges, South Australia.

The GSSP of the upper boundary of the Ediacaran is the lower boundary of the Cambrian on the SE coast of Newfoundland approved by the International Commission on Stratigraphy as a preferred alternative to the base of the Tommotian Stage in Siberia which was selected on the basis of the ichnofossil Treptichnus pedum (Seilacher, 1955). In the history of stratigraphy it was the first case of usage of bioturbations for the System boundary definition.

Nevertheless, the definitions of the lower and upper boundaries of the Ediacaran on the basis of chemostratigraphy and ichnofossils are disputable.

Cap carbonates generally have a restricted geographic distribution (due to specific conditions of their precipitation) and usually siliciclastic sediments laterally replace the cap carbonates in a rather short distance but cap carbonates do not occur above every tillite elsewhere in the world.

The C-isotope chemostratigraphic characteristics obtained for contemporaneous cap carbonates in different parts of the world may be variable in a wide range owing to different degrees of secondary alteration of carbonates, dissimilar criteria used for selection of the least altered samples, and, as far as the C-isotope data are concerned, due to primary lateral variations of δ ^{l3}C_{carb} in the upper layer of the ocean.

Furthermore, Oman presents in its stratigraphic record a large negative carbon isotope excursion, within the Shuram Formation that is clearly away from any glacial evidence strongly questioning systematic association of negative δ ^{l3}C_{carb} excursion and glacial events. Also, the Shuram excursion is prolonged and is estimated to last for ~9.0 Myrs.

As to the Treptichnus pedum, a reference ichnofossil for the lower boundary of the Cambrian, its usage for the stratigraphic detection of this boundary is always risky, because of the occurrence of very similar trace fossils belonging to the Treptichnids group well below the level of T. pedum in Namibia, Spain and Newfoundland, and possibly, in the western United States. The stratigraphic range of T. pedum overlaps the range of the Ediacaran fossils in Namibia, and probably in Spain.

== Subdivisions ==
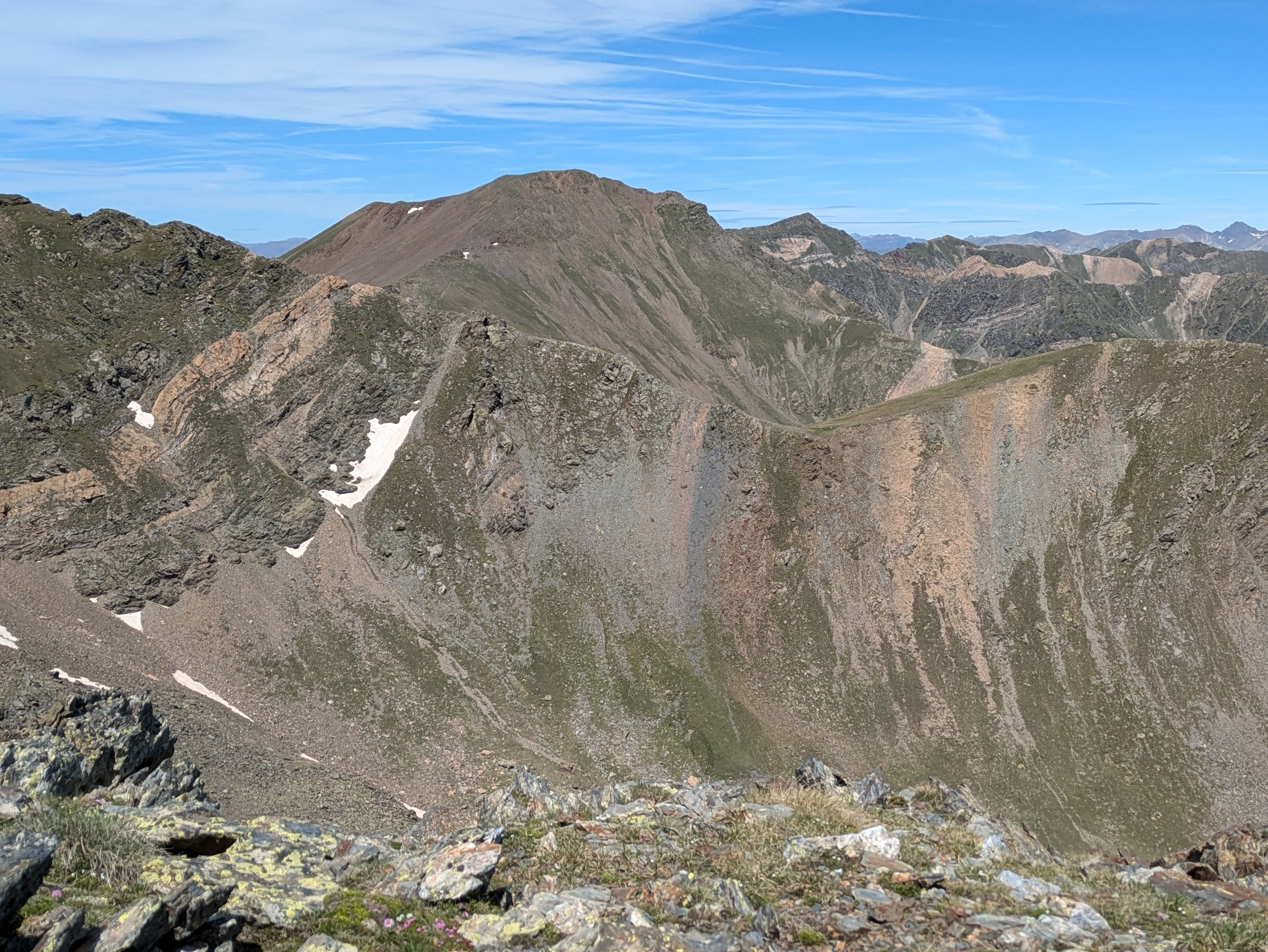
Outcrops of micaschists and marble of the Groupe de Canaveilles (Ediacaran, c. 580 Ma) in the eastern Pyrenees (commune of Fontpédrouse, France)

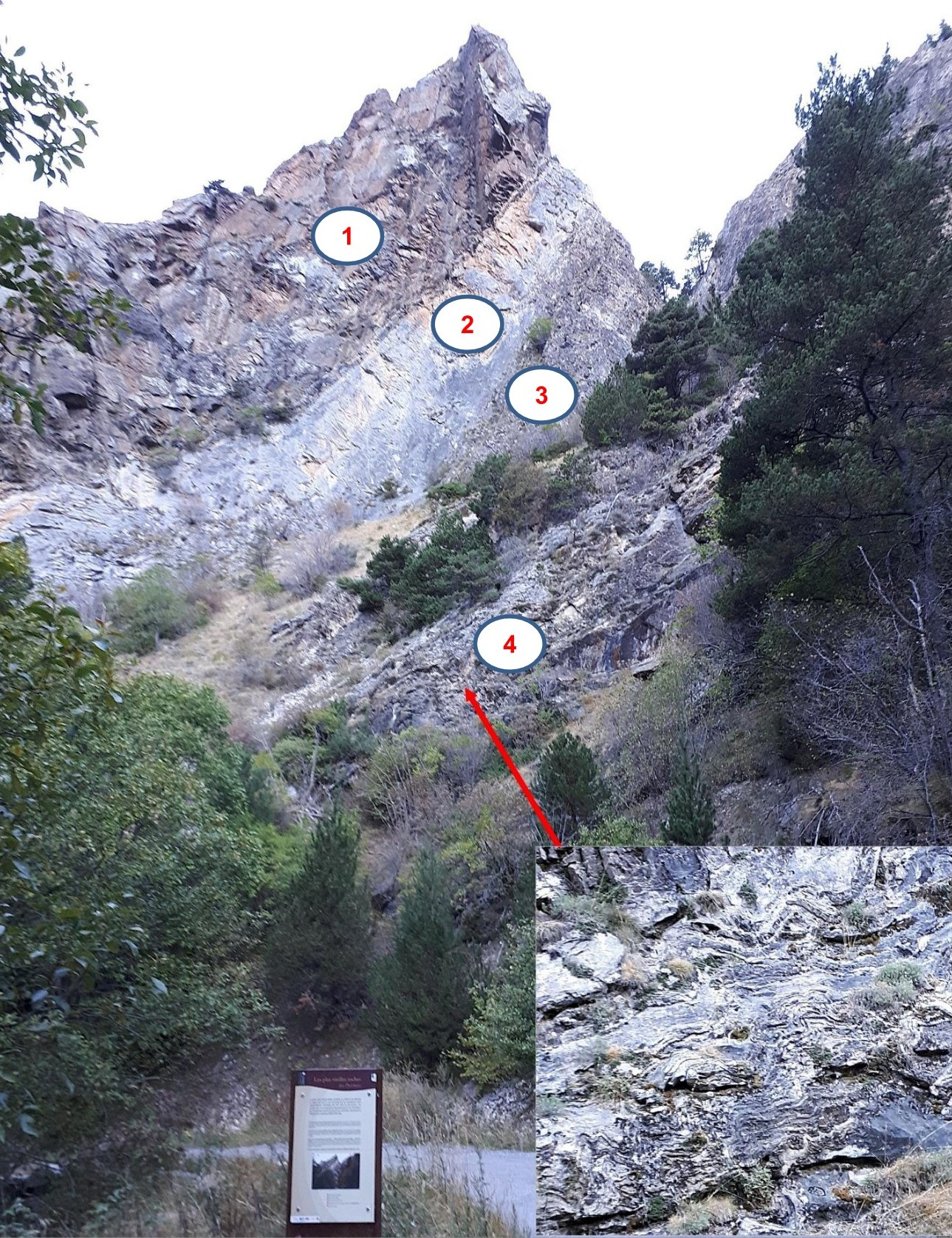
Groupe de Canaveilles exposure (Piton de Castell Vidre) in the eastern Pyrenees (commune of Llo, France). 1 - Very silicious schist. 2 - Marble. 3 - Limestone and dolomite. 4 (& inset) - "Barégiennes" (thin, deformed, alternating calcareous/siliceous beds).

The Ediacaran Period is not yet formally subdivided, but a proposed scheme recognises an Upper Ediacaran whose base corresponds with the Gaskiers glaciation, a Terminal Ediacaran Stage starting around 550 million years ago, a preceding stage beginning around 575 million years ago with the earliest widespread Ediacaran biota fossils; two proposed schemes differ on whether the lower strata should be divided into an Early and Middle Ediacaran or not, because it is not clear whether the Shuram excursion (which would divide the Early and Middle) is a separate event from the Gaskiers, or whether the two events are correlated.

== Absolute dating ==
The dating of the rock type section of the Ediacaran Period in South Australia has proven uncertain due to lack of overlying igneous material. Therefore, the age range of 635 to 538.8 million years ago is based on correlations to other countries where dating has been possible. The base age of approximately 635 million years is based on U–Pb (uranium–lead) and Re–Os (rhenium–osmium) dating from Africa, China, North America, and Tasmania.

== Biota ==
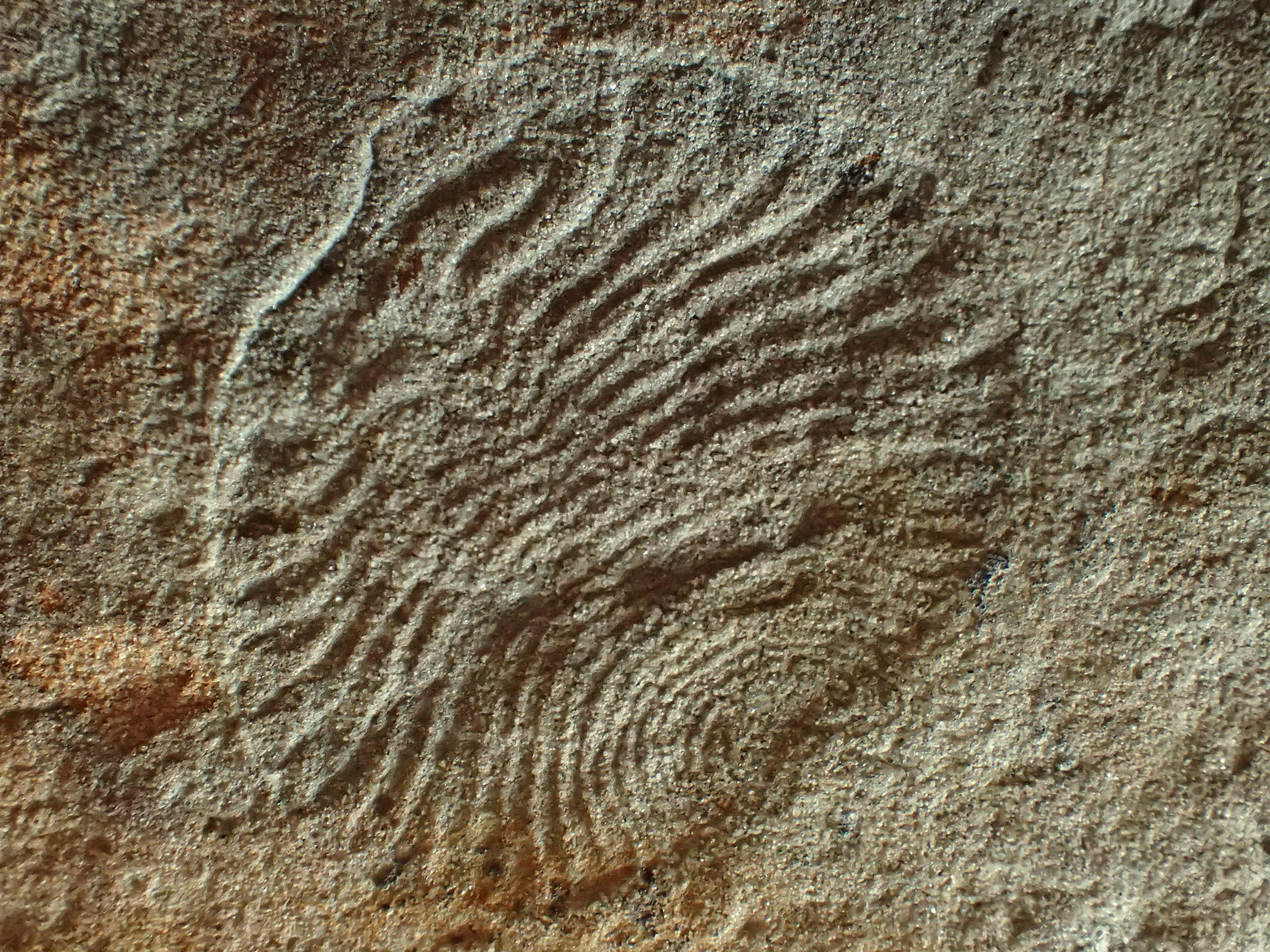
Archaeaspinus, a representative of phylum Proarticulata which also includes Dickinsonia, Karakhtia, Spriggina and numerous other organisms. They are members of the Ediacaran biota.

The fossil record from most of the Ediacaran Period is sparse, as more easily fossilized hard-shelled animals did not evolve until the latest Ediacaran. The Ediacaran biota include the oldest definite multicellular organisms (with specialized tissues), the most common types of which resemble segmented worms, fronds, disks, or immobile bags. Among largely undisputed animals, Auroralumina and Haootia were cnidarians, while Yilingia represented the motile bilaterians. Sponges recognisable as such also appeared during the latest Ediacaran, including Helicolocellus, a likely non-biomineralizing sponge.

Other than these definitive animals, most members of the Ediacaran biota bear little resemblance to modern lifeforms, and their relationship with even the immediately following lifeforms of the Cambrian explosion is rather difficult to interpret. More than 100 genera have been described, and well known forms include Arkarua, Charnia, Dickinsonia, Ediacaria, Marywadea, Cephalonega, Pteridinium, and Yorgia. However, despite the overall enigmaticness of most Ediacaran organisms, some fossils identifiable as hard-shelled agglutinated foraminifera (which are not classified as animals) are known from latest Ediacaran sediments of western Siberia.

Most of the organisms described above were sessile or possessed limited motility, with only a few taxa, such as Kimberella, leaving continuous grazing traces in the form of the trace fossil Kimberichnus. However, trace fossil records indicate a more motile ecology during the terminal Ediacaran, including traces such as Archaeonassa, Arenicolites, Bergaueria, Gordia, Helminthopsis, Helminthoidichnites, Lamonte, Palaeophycus, Parapsammichnites, and Planolites. The tracemakers of many of these ichnotaxa survived into the Cambrian, as evidenced by their continuous ichnological record, and some may have persisted to the present day. For example, Bergaueria is widely regarded as having been produced by organisms comparable to modern sea anemones. Among these trace fossils, trajectory-type trails and shallow burrows provide insights into the biophysical characteristics of their tracemakers. Increased trajectorial smoothness through the Ediacaran has been interpreted as evidence for increasing body aspect ratios, exceeding 8 in some terminal Ediacaran forms, as well as enhanced locomotory stability and muscular coordination. Concentrated foraging patterns have been interpreted as evidence for optimized cue-following navigation, and quantitative studies suggest that only a decimetre-scale sensory range could support the accurate and densely space-filling trajectories observed in looping Parapsammichnites. Comparisons with sensory scaling relationships in modern organisms have further suggested that such sensory ranges may have been compatible with light detection. The tracemakers responsible for these traces may have belonged to stem-group eumetazoans or represented early relatives of animal phyla that later diversified during the Cambrian.

Four different biotic intervals are known in the Ediacaran, each being characterised by the prominence of a unique ecology and faunal assemblage. The first spanned from 635 to around 575 Ma and was dominated by acritarchs known as large ornamented Ediacaran microfossils. The second spanned from around 575 to 560 Ma and was characterised by the Avalon biota, where earliest trace fossils left by motile organisms were recorded. The third spanned from 560 to 550 Ma; its biota has been dubbed the White Sea biota due to many fossils from this time being found along the coasts of the White Sea. The fourth lasted from 550 to 539 Ma and is known as the interval of the Nama biotic assemblage.

There is evidence for a mass extinction during this period from early animals changing the environment, dating to the same time as the transition between the White Sea and the Nama-type biotas. Alternatively, this mass extinction has also been theorised to have been the result of an anoxic event.

== Astronomical factors ==
The relative proximity of the Moon at this time meant that tides were stronger and more rapid than they are now. The day was 21.9 ± 0.4 hours, and there were 13.1 ± 0.1 synodic months/year and 400 ± 7 solar days/year.

== Documentaries ==
A few English language documentaries have featured the Ediacaran Period and biota:

- Australia: The Time Traveller's Guide (2012, ABC Science; Part 1 of 4).
- The Geological History of Canada, as part of The Nature of Things series, CBC-SRC; 2011; Eastern Canada.
- The first episode of a BBC documentary titled Life on Earth, with David Attenborough as narrator.
- Another documentary narrated by David Attenborough titled First Life featuring Charnia, Dickinsonia, Spriggina, Funisia, and Kimberella animated in CGI.
- The third episode of "Evolution", a 2026 BBC series.

== See also ==
- List of fossil sites (with link directory)
- Avalon explosion – Proposed evolutionary event in the history of metazoa, producing the Ediacaran biota
- End-Ediacaran extinction – Mass extinction event at the end of the Ediacaran period, 539 million years ago
