= Borovina, Vologda Oblast =

Borovina Боровина
- Village
- Location within Vologda Oblast Location within Russia
- Coordinates: 60°47′N 42°06′E
- Country: Russia
- Region: Vologda Oblast
- District: Verkhovazhsky District

Population
  - Total: 73
- Time zone: UTC+3:00

Borovina (Russian: Боровина) is a rural locality (a village) in Nizhne-Vazhskoye Rural Settlement, Verkhovazhsky District, Vologda Oblast, Russia. The population was 73 as of 2002.

== Geography ==
Borovina is located 6 km northeast of Verkhovazhye (the district's administrative centre) by road. Ivanovskaya is the nearest rural locality.
