= Redkino =

Redkino (Russian: Редкино or Редькино) is the name of several inhabited localities in Russia.

== Republic of Bashkortostan ==
As of 2022, one rural locality in the Republic of Bashkortostan bears this name:

- Redkino, Republic of Bashkortostan, a village in Kuyanovsky Selsoviet of Krasnokamsky District

== Kaluga Oblast ==
As of 2022, two rural localities in Kaluga Oblast bear this name:

- Redkino, Borovsky District, Kaluga Oblast, a village in Borovsky District
- Redkino, Dzerzhinsky District, Kaluga Oblast, a village in Dzerzhinsky District

== Kirov Oblast ==
As of 2022, one rural locality in Kirov Oblast bears this name:

- Redkino, Kirov Oblast, a village in Krasnoyarsky Rural Okrug of Lebyazhsky District

== Kurgan Oblast ==
As of 2022, one rural locality in Kurgan Oblast bears this name:

- Redkino, Kurgan Oblast, a village in Rychkovsky Selsoviet of Belozersky District

== Kursk Oblast ==
As of 2022, one rural locality in Kursk Oblast bears this name:

- Redkino, Kursk Oblast, a khutor in Sedmikhovsky Selsoviet of Zolotukhinsky District

== Leningrad Oblast ==
As of 2022, one rural locality in Leningrad Oblast bears this name:

- Redkino, Leningrad Oblast, a village in Sabskoye Settlement Municipal Formation of Volosovsky District

== Lipetsk Oblast ==
As of 2022, one rural locality in Lipetsk Oblast bears this name:

- Redkino, Lipetsk Oblast, a village in Afanasyevsky Selsoviet of Izmalkovsky District

== Moscow Oblast ==
As of 2022, eight rural localities in Moscow Oblast bear this name:

- Redkino, Domodedovo, Moscow Oblast, a village under the administrative jurisdiction of the Domodedovo City Under Oblast Jurisdiction
- Redkino, Gabovskoye Rural Settlement, Dmitrovsky District, Moscow Oblast, a village in Gabovskoye Rural Settlement of Dmitrovsky District
- Redkino, Dmitrov Town, Dmitrovsky District, Moscow Oblast, a village under the administrative jurisdiction of the town of Dmitrov, Dmitrovsky District
- Redkino, Lotoshinsky District, Moscow Oblast, a village under the administrative jurisdiction of the work settlement of Lotoshino, Lotoshinsky District
- Redkino, Naro-Fominsky District, Moscow Oblast, a village in Tashirovskoye Rural Settlement of Naro-Fominsky District
- Redkino, Ozyorsky District, Moscow Oblast, a selo in Klishinskoye Rural Settlement of Ozyorsky District
- Redkino, Ramensky District, Moscow Oblast, a village in Chulkovskoye Rural Settlement of Ramensky District
- Redkino, Ruzsky District, Moscow Oblast, a village in Kolyubakinskoye Rural Settlement of Ruzsky District

== Nizhny Novgorod Oblast ==
As of 2022, three rural localities in Nizhny Novgorod Oblast bear this name:

- Redkino, Bor, Nizhny Novgorod Oblast, a selo in Redkinsky Selsoviet of the city of oblast significance of Bor
- Redkino (selo), Zinyakovsky Selsoviet, Gorodetsky District, Nizhny Novgorod Oblast, a selo in Zinyakovsky Selsoviet of Gorodetsky District
- Redkino (village), Zinyakovsky Selsoviet, Gorodetsky District, Nizhny Novgorod Oblast, a village in Zinyakovsky Selsoviet of Gorodetsky District

== Oryol Oblast ==
As of 2022, two rural localities in Oryol Oblast bear this name:

- Redkino, Kolpnyansky District, Oryol Oblast, a village in Krutovsky Selsoviet of Kolpnyansky District
- Redkino, Livensky District, Oryol Oblast, a village in Vakhnovsky Selsoviet of Livensky District

== Perm Krai ==
As of 2022, one rural locality in Perm Krai bears this name:

- Redkino, Perm Krai, a village in Oktyabrsky District

== Pskov Oblast ==
As of 2022, three rural localities in Pskov Oblast bear this name:

- Redkino, Novorzhevsky District, Pskov Oblast, a village in Novorzhevsky District
- Redkino, Ostrovsky District, Pskov Oblast, a village in Ostrovsky District
- Redkino, Pytalovsky District, Pskov Oblast, a village in Pytalovsky District

== Smolensk Oblast ==
As of 2022, one rural locality in Smolensk Oblast bears this name:

- Redkino, Smolensk Oblast, a village in Pigulinskoye Rural Settlement of Kholm-Zhirkovsky District

== Tambov Oblast ==
As of 2022, one rural locality in Tambov Oblast bears this name:

- Redkino, Tambov Oblast, a village in Vishnevsky Selsoviet of Staroyuryevsky District

== Tver Oblast ==
As of 2022, five inhabited localities in Tver Oblast bear this name.

Urban localities

- Redkino, Konakovsky District, Tver Oblast, an urban-type settlement in Konakovsky District

Rural localities

- Redkino, Oleninsky District, Tver Oblast, a village in Oleninsky District
- Redkino, Rzhevsky District, Tver Oblast, a village in Rzhevsky District
- Redkino, Torzhoksky District, Tver Oblast, a village in Torzhoksky District
- Redkino, Vyshnevolotsky District, Tver Oblast, a village in Vyshnevolotsky District

== Vologda Oblast ==
As of 2022, one rural locality in Vologda Oblast bears this name:

- Redkino, Vologda Oblast, a village in Markovsky Selsoviet of Vologodsky District
