= Ivanivske =

Ivanivske may refer to:

- Ivanivske, Dnipropetrovsk Oblast, Ukraine
- Ivanivske, Donetsk Oblast, Ukraine
- Ivanivske, Kharkiv Oblast, Ukraine
- Ivanivske, Sumy Oblast, Ukraine
- Ivanivske, Zaporizhzhia Oblast, Ukraine
- Lotykove, a town in Luhansk Oblast, Ukraine, officially renamed to Ivanivske in 2016

== See also ==
- Ivanovsky (disambiguation)
