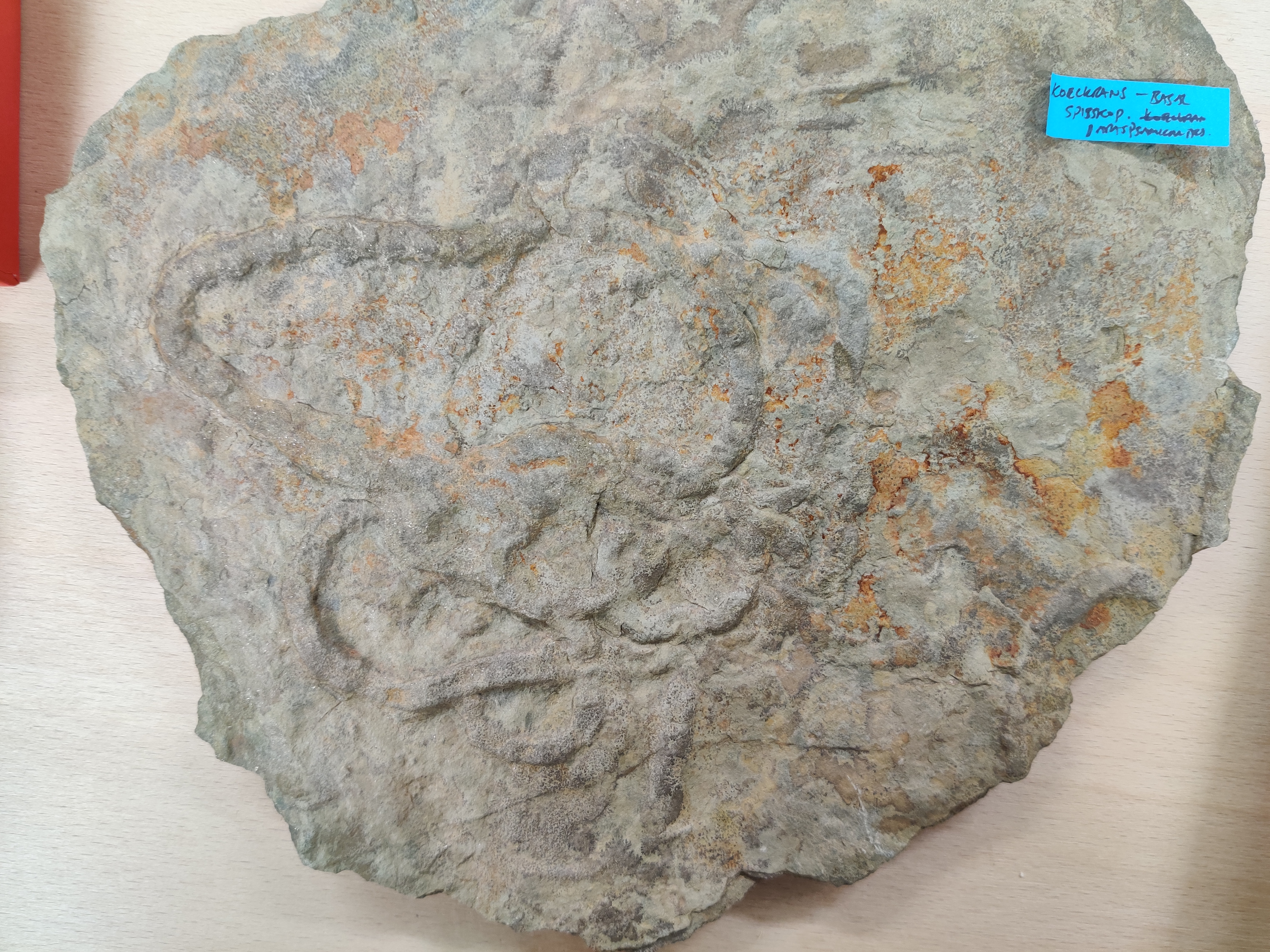
- Trace fossil Parapsammichnites

Trace fossil classification
- Ichnogenus: Parapsammichnites

= Parapsammichnites =

Trace fossil

Parapsammichnites is a mostly horizontal ichnotaxon (taxon based on the fossilized work of an organism) with a unilobate to bilobate basal surface, locally displaying thin transverse lamination organized in inclined sediment pads. In cross section, the trace fossil is typically flat ellipsoidal to biconvex lenticular. It is preserved mainly as full-relief structures on bed soles and more rarely as positive ridges on sandstone tops.

The ichnogenus contains a single valid ichnospecies, Parapsammichnites pretzeliformis, characterized by densely looping and trajectorially smooth traces. Quantitative analyses of trajectory smoothness have been interpreted as indicating a relatively slender-bodied tracemaker, comparable to annelids or palaeoscolecids.

Parapsammichnites is currently known only from strata immediately below the Ediacaran–Cambrian boundary in the Feldschuhhorn Member and lower Spitskop Member of the Urusis Formation, Nama Group, Namibia. These deposits have been dated to approximately 539.36–538.92 million years ago.

Studies of body plan constraints and sensory ecology inferred from Parapsammichnites and these trace fossils have been interpreted as evidence for the presence of relatively sophisticated bilaterian anatomies and behaviours near the end of the Ediacaran Period. These findings have been discussed in the context of the early development of the Cambrian substrate revolution and increasing behavioural complexity preceding the Cambrian explosion.
