= Ivanovskoye, Markovsky Selsoviet, Vologodsky District, Vologda Oblast =

Ivanovskoye Ивановское
- Village
- Location within Vologda Oblast Location within Russia
- Coordinates: 59°02′N 40°07′E
- Country: Russia
- Region: Vologda Oblast
- District: Vologodsky District
- Time zone: UTC+3:00

Ivanovskoye (Russian: Ивановское) is a rural locality (a village) in Markovskoye Rural Settlement, Vologodsky District, Vologda Oblast, Russia. The population was 2 as of 2002.

== Geography ==
The distance to Vologda is 29 km, to Vasilievskoye is 7 km. Neverovskoye, Frolovskoye, Redkino, Markovo are the nearest rural localities.
