= Redkino, Republic of Bashkortostan =

Redkino Редькино
- Village
- Location within Bashkortostan Location within Russia
- Coordinates: 55°48′N 54°30′E
- Country: Russia
- Region: Bashkortostan
- District: Krasnokamsky District
- Time zone: UTC+5:00

Redkino (Russian: Редькино; Meadow Mari: Ушмен, Ušmen) is a rural locality (a village) in Kuyanovsky Selsoviet, Krasnokamsky District, Bashkortostan, Russia. The population was 898 as of 2010. There are 10 streets.

== Geography ==
Redkino is located 50 km southeast of Nikolo-Beryozovka (the district's administrative centre) by road. Kuyanovo is the nearest rural locality.
