= Vasilyevskoye, Vologodsky District, Vologda Oblast =

Vasilyevskoye Васильевское
- Settlement
- Location within Vologda Oblast Location within Russia
- Coordinates: 59°05′N 40°08′E
- Country: Russia
- Region: Vologda Oblast
- District: Vologodsky District
- Time zone: UTC+3:00

Vasilyevskoye (Russian: Васильевское) is a rural locality (a settlement) and the administrative center of Markovskoye Rural Settlement, Vologodsky District, Vologda Oblast, Russia. The population was 1,634 as of 2002. There are 26 streets.

== Geography ==
Vasilyevskoye is located 23 km southeast of Vologda (the district's administrative centre) by road. Lukintsevo is the nearest rural locality.
