= Svecha =

Svecha Свеча
- Urban-type settlement
- Interactive map of Svecha
- Location of Svecha Svecha (Kirov Oblast)
- Coordinates: 58.2786°N 47.5113°E
- Country: Russia
- Federal subject: Kirov Oblast
- Administrative district: Svechinsky District
- Founded: 1903
- Elevation: 131 m (430 ft)

Population (2010 Census)
  - Total: 4,760
  - Estimate (2021): 3,865 (−18.8%)
- Time zone: UTC+3 (MSK)
- Postal code: 612040
- OKTMO ID: 33634151051

Svecha (Russian: Свеча) is an urban locality (an urban-type settlement) in Svechinsky District of Kirov Oblast, Russia. Population: 4,760 (2010 census); 5,127 (2002 census); 5,727 (1989 Soviet census).
