= Ivanovsky, Panfilovsky Selsoviet, Novoanninsky District, Volgograd Oblast =

Ivanovsky Ивановский
- Khutor
- Location within Volgograd Oblast Location within Russia
- Coordinates: 50°22′N 42°48′E
- Country: Russia
- Region: Volgograd Oblast
- District: Novoanninsky District
- Time zone: UTC+4:00

Ivanovsky (Russian: Ивановский) is a rural locality (a khutor) in Panfilovskoye Rural Settlement, Novoanninsky District, Volgograd Oblast, Russia. The population was 85 as of 2010.

== Geography ==
The village is located in forest steppe on the Khopyorsko-Buzulukskaya Plain.
