= Ivanovsky, Astrakhan Oblast =

Ivanovsky Ивановский
- Settlement
- Location within Astrakhan Oblast Location within Russia
- Coordinates: 46°20′N 48°17′E
- Country: Russia
- Region: Astrakhan Oblast
- District: Privolzhsky District
- Time zone: UTC+4:00

Ivanovsky (Russian: Ивановский) is a rural locality (a settlement) in Nachalovsky Selsoviet, Privolzhsky District, Astrakhan Oblast, Russia. The population was 63 as of 2010. There are 10 streets.

== Geography ==
Ivanovsky is located 9 km east of Nachalovo (the district's administrative centre) by road. Bushma and Biryukovka are the nearest rural localities.
