= Ivanovsky, Amur Oblast =

Ivanovsky Ивановский
- Settlement
- Location within Amur Oblast Location within Russia
- Coordinates: 52°17′N 129°32′E
- Country: Russia
- Region: Amur Oblast
- District: Mazanovsky District
- Time zone: UTC+9:00

Ivanovsky (Russian: Ивановский) is a rural locality (a settlement) and the administrative center of Maysky Selsoviet of Mazanovsky District, Amur Oblast, Russia. The population was 424 as of 2018. There are 9 streets.

== Geography ==
Ivanovsky is located 11 km from the right bank of the Selemdzha River, 116 km northeast of Novokiyevsky Uval (the district's administrative centre) by road. Maysky is the nearest rural locality.
