= Ivanovsky, Republic of Bashkortostan =

Ivanovsky Ивановский
- Settlement
- Location within Bashkortostan Location within Russia
- Coordinates: 54°54′N 56°08′E
- Country: Russia
- Region: Bashkortostan
- District: Ufa
- Time zone: UTC+5:00

Ivanovsky (Russian: Ивановский) is a rural locality (a settlement) in Ufa, Bashkortostan, Russia. The population was 123 as of 2010. There are 2 streets.

== Geography ==
Ivanovsky is located 26 km northeast of Ufa. Novye Cherkassy is the nearest rural locality.
