= Ivanovskaya, Totemsky District, Vologda Oblast =

Ivanovskaya Ивановская
- Village
- Location within Vologda Oblast Location within Russia
- Coordinates: 59°57′N 42°18′E
- Country: Russia
- Region: Vologda Oblast
- District: Totemsky District
- Time zone: UTC+3:00

Ivanovskaya (Russian: Ивановская) is a rural locality (a village) in Vozhbalskoye Rural Settlement, Totemsky District, Vologda Oblast, Russia. The population was 18 as of 2002.

== Geography ==
Ivanovskaya is located 37 km west of Totma (the district's administrative centre) by road. Yartsevo is the nearest rural locality.
