= Ivanovskaya, Vozhegodsky Selsoviet, Vozhegodsky District, Vologda Oblast =

Ivanovskaya Ивановская
- Village
- Location within Vologda Oblast Location within Russia
- Coordinates: 60°24′N 39°59′E
- Country: Russia
- Region: Vologda Oblast
- District: Vozhegodsky District
- Time zone: UTC+3:00

Ivanovskaya (Russian: Ивановская) is a rural locality (a village) in Vozhegodskoye Urban Settlement, Vozhegodsky District, Vologda Oblast, Russia. The population was 6 as of 2002.

== Geography ==
The distance to Vozhega is 13 km. Podolnaya, Samoylovskaya, Pavlovskaya are the nearest rural localities.
