= Ivanovskoye, Ivanovo Oblast =

Ivanovskoye Ивановское
- Village
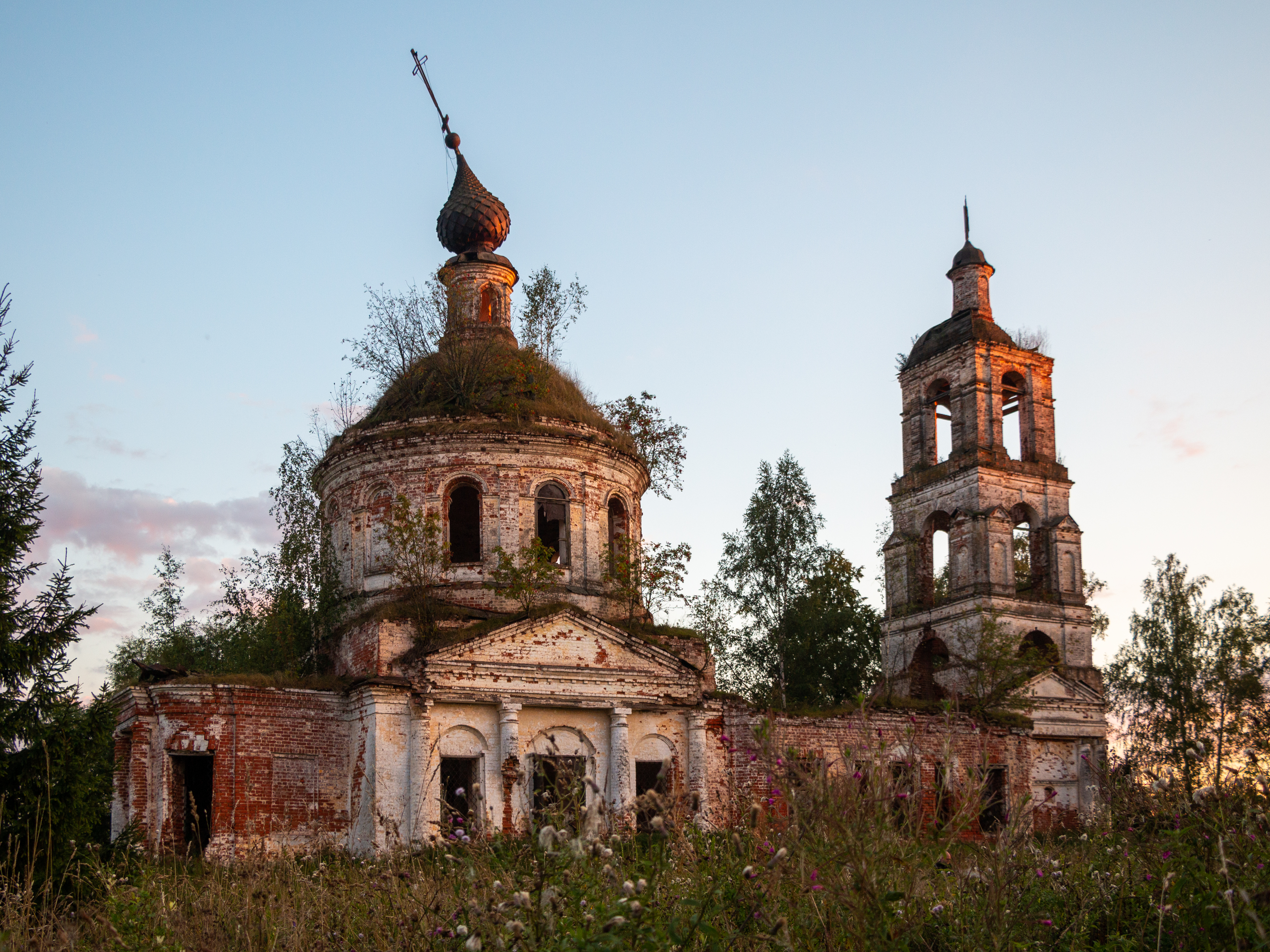

- Location within Ivanovo Oblast Location within Russia
- Coordinates: 57°18′N 41°13′E
- Country: Russia
- Region: Ivanovo Oblast
- District: Privolzhsky District
- Time zone: UTC+3:00

Ivanovskoye (Russian: Ивановское) is a rural locality (a selo) in Privolzhsky District, Ivanovo Oblast, Russia. Population: 30 (2010 census);

== Geography ==
This rural locality is located 10 kilometres (6.2 mi) from Privolzhsk (the district's administrative centre), 38 kilometres (24 mi) from Ivanovo (capital of Ivanovo Oblast) and 277 kilometres (172 mi) from Moscow. Sandyrevo is the nearest rural locality.
