= Ivanovskaya, Ust-Kubinsky District, Vologda Oblast =

Ivanovskaya Ивановская
- Village
- Location within Vologda Oblast Location within Russia
- Coordinates: 59°55′N 39°15′E
- Country: Russia
- Region: Vologda Oblast
- District: Ust-Kubinsky District
- Time zone: UTC+3:00

Ivanovskaya (Russian: Ивановская) is a rural locality (a village) in Troitskoye Rural Settlement, Ust-Kubinsky District, Vologda Oblast, Russia. The population was 9 as of 2002.

== Geography ==
Ivanovskaya is located 4 km north of Ustye (the district's administrative centre) by road. Korovino is the nearest rural locality.
