= Ivanovskoye, Amur Oblast =

Ivanovskoye Ивановское
- Selo
- Location within Amur Oblast Location within Russia
- Coordinates: 52°51′N 133°24′E
- Country: Russia
- Region: Amur Oblast
- District: Selemdzhinsky District
- Time zone: UTC+9:00

Ivanovskoye (Russian: Ивановское) is a rural locality (a selo) in ivanovsky Selsoviet of Selemdzhinsky District, Amur Oblast, Russia. The population was 374 as of 2018. There are 9 streets.

== Geography ==
Ivanovskoye is located in the valley of the Elga River, 64 km southeast of Ekimchan (the district's administrative centre) by road. Olginsk is the nearest rural locality.
