= Ivanovskoye, Perm Krai =

Ivanovskoye Ивановское
- Selo
- Location within Perm Krai Location within Russia
- Coordinates: 58°46′N 55°37′E
- Country: Russia
- Region: Perm Krai
- District: Ilyinsky District
- Time zone: UTC+5:00

Ivanovskoye (Russian: Ивановское) is a rural locality (a selo) and the administrative center of Ivanovskoye Rural Settlement, Ilyinsky District, Perm Krai, Russia. The population was 384 as of 2010. There are 14 streets.
