= Ivanovskoye, Ustyuzhensky District, Vologda Oblast =

Ivanovskoye Ивановское
- Village
- Location within Vologda Oblast Location within Russia
- Coordinates: 58°38′N 36°32′E
- Country: Russia
- Region: Vologda Oblast
- District: Ustyuzhensky District
- Time zone: UTC+3:00

Ivanovskoye (Russian: Ивановское) is a rural locality (a village) in Nikiforovskoye Rural Settlement, Ustyuzhensky District, Vologda Oblast, Russia. The population was 39 as of 2002.

== Geography ==
Ivanovskoye is located 26 km (16 mi) south of Ustyuzhna (the district's administrative centre) by road. Konyukhovo is the nearest rural locality.
