= Ivanovskoye, Suzdalsky District, Vladimir Oblast =

Ivanovskoye Ивановское
- Selo
- Location within Vladimir Oblast Location within Russia
- Coordinates: 56°24′N 40°25′E
- Country: Russia
- Region: Vladimir Oblast
- District: Suzdalsky District
- Time zone: UTC+3:00

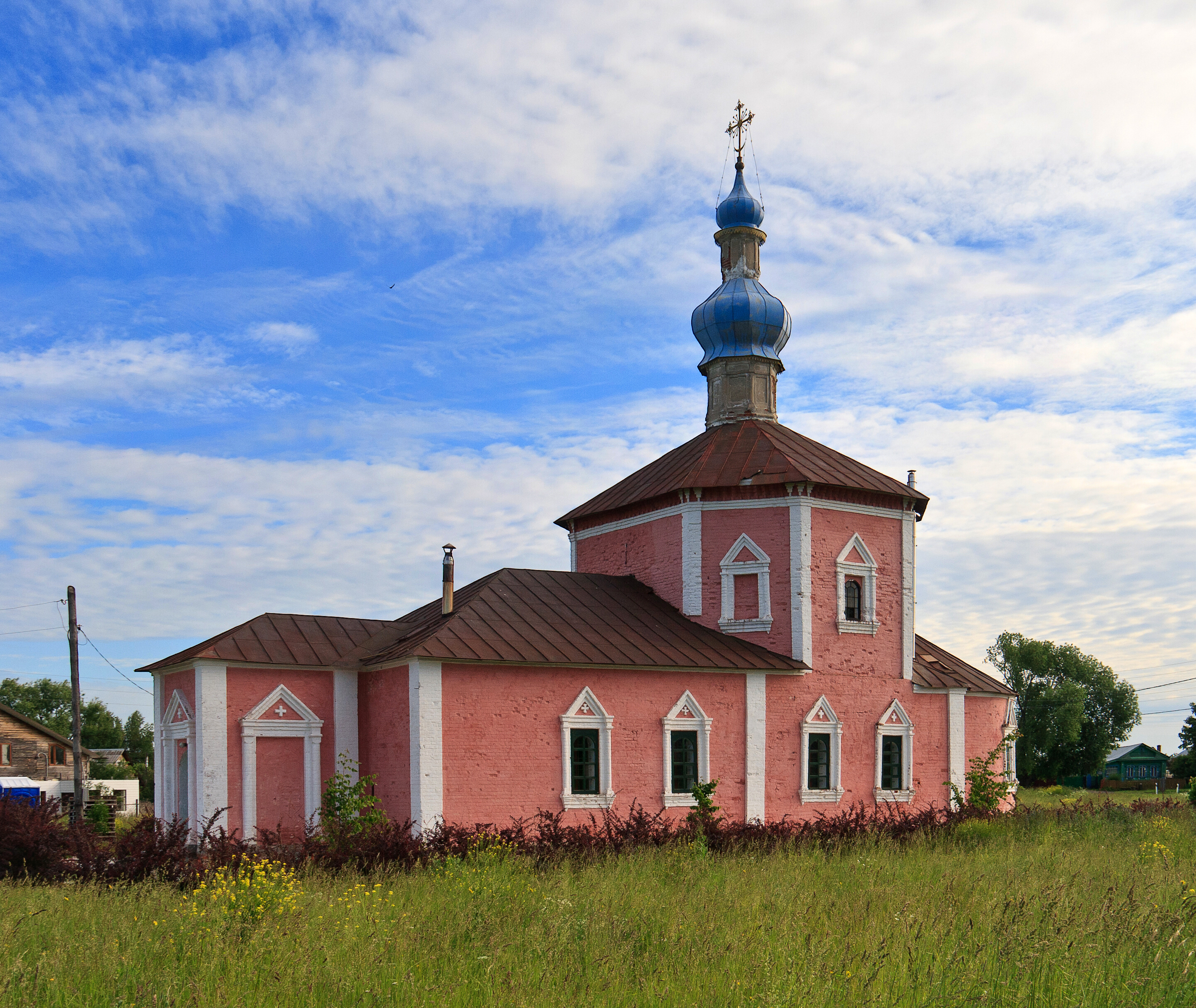
Church of Michael the Archangel, Ivanovskoye, Suzdalsky District, Vladimir Oblast, Russia

Ivanovskoye (Russian: Ивановское) is a rural locality (a selo) in Seletskoye Rural Settlement, Suzdalsky District, Vladimir Oblast, Russia. The population was 442 as of 2010. There are 7 streets.

== Geography ==
Ivanovskoye is located 2 km southwest of Suzdal (the district's administrative centre) by road. Suzdal is the nearest rural locality.
