= Ivanovskaya, Selivanovsky District, Vladimir Oblast =

Ivanovskaya Ивановская
- Village
- Location within Vladimir Oblast Location within Russia
- Coordinates: 55°38′N 41°20′E
- Country: Russia
- Region: Vladimir Oblast
- District: Selivanovsky District
- Time zone: UTC+3:00

Ivanovskaya (Russian: Ивановская) is a rural locality (a village) in Malyshevskoye Rural Settlement, Selivanovsky District, Vladimir Oblast, Russia. The population was 161 as of 2010. There are 2 streets.

== Geography ==
Ivanovskaya is located 46 km southwest of Krasnaya Gorbatka (the district's administrative centre) by road. Pervomaysky is the nearest rural locality.
