= Ivanovskoye, Spassky Selsoviet, Vologodsky District, Vologda Oblast =

Ivanovskoye Ивановское
- Village
- Location within Vologda Oblast Location within Russia
- Coordinates: 59°10′N 39°47′E
- Country: Russia
- Region: Vologda Oblast
- District: Vologodsky District
- Time zone: UTC+3:00

Ivanovskoye (Russian: Ивановское) is a rural locality (a village) in Spasskoye Rural Settlement, Vologodsky District, Vologda Oblast, Russia. The population was 9 as of 2002.

== Geography ==
The distance to Vologda is 13 km, to Neponyatovo is 3 km. Dmitriyevskoye, Pilatovo, Yaskino and Abramtsevo are the nearest rural localities.
