= Svechinsky District =

Svechinsky District Свечинский район (Russian)
- District
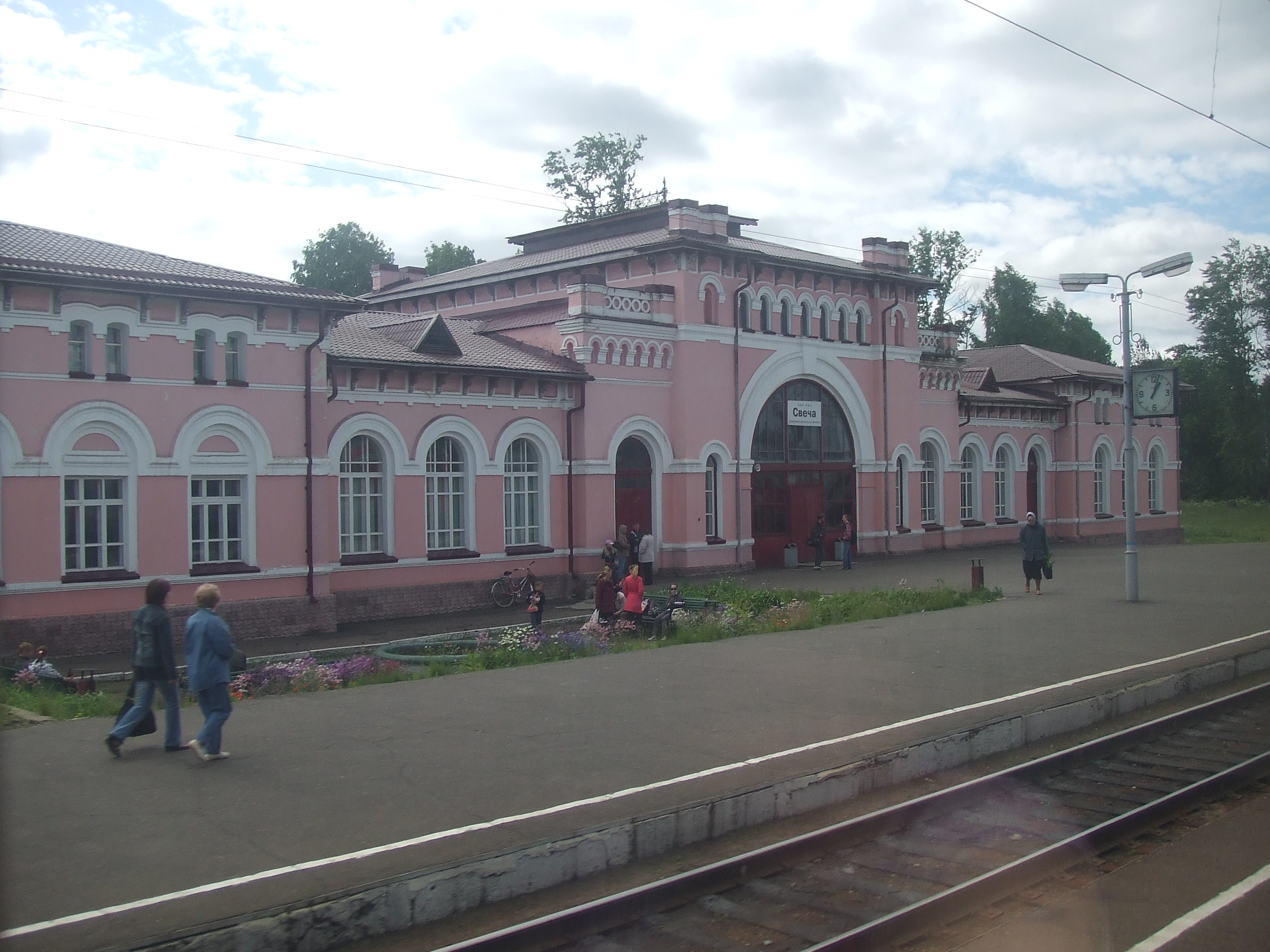
- Train station in Svecha, Svechinsky District

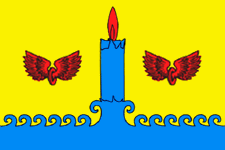
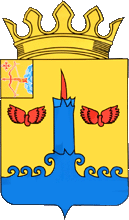
- Flag Coat of arms
- Location of Svechinsky District in Kirov Oblast
- Coordinates: 58°16′N 47°30′E
- Country: Russia
- Federal subject: Kirov Oblast
- Established: 10 June 1929
- Administrative center: Svecha

Area
  - Total: 1,773 km^{2} (685 sq mi)

Population (2010 Census)
  - Total: 8,517
  - Density: 4.804/km^{2} (12.44/sq mi)
  - Urban: 55.9%
  - Rural: 44.1%

Administrative structure
  - Administrative divisions: 1 Urban-type settlements, 1 Rural okrugs
  - Inhabited localities: 1 urban-type settlements, 70 rural localities

Municipal structure
  - Municipally incorporated as: Svechinsky Municipal District
  - Municipal divisions: 1 urban settlements, 1 rural settlements
- Time zone: UTC+3 (MSK)
- OKTMO ID: 33634000
- Website: http://svechamunicipal.ru/

Svechinsky District (Russian: Свечинский райо́н) is an administrative and municipal district (raion), one of the thirty-nine in Kirov Oblast, Russia. It is located in the west of the oblast. The area of the district is 1,773 square kilometers (685 sq mi). Its administrative center is the urban locality (an urban-type settlement) of Svecha. Population: 8,517 (2010 census); 10,229 (2002 Census); 12,229 (1989 Soviet census). The population of Svecha accounts for 55.9% of the district's total population.
