= Ivanovskoye, Cherepovetsky District, Vologda Oblast =

Ivanovskoye Ивановское
- Selo
- Location within Vologda Oblast Location within Russia
- Coordinates: 59°29′N 37°57′E
- Country: Russia
- Region: Vologda Oblast
- District: Cherepovetsky District
- Time zone: UTC+3:00

Ivanovskoye (Russian: Ивановское) is a rural locality (a selo) in Voskresenskoye Rural Settlement, Cherepovetsky District, Vologda Oblast, Russia. The population was 379 as of 2002. There are 4 streets.

== Geography ==
Ivanovskoye is located 48 km (30 mi) northeast of Cherepovets (the district's administrative centre) by road. Staroye Zakharovo is the nearest rural locality.
