= Ivanovskoye (Andreyevskoye Rural Settlement), Alexandrovsky District, Vladimir Oblast =

Ivanovskoye Ивановское
- Village
- Location within Vladimir Oblast Location within Russia
- Coordinates: 56°28′N 39°00′E
- Country: Russia
- Region: Vladimir Oblast
- District: Alexandrovsky District
- Time zone: UTC+3:00

Ivanovskoye (Russian: Ивановское) is a rural locality (a village) in Andreyevskoye Rural Settlement, Alexandrovsky District, Vladimir Oblast, Russia. The population was 16 as of 2010.

== Geography ==
The village is located 19 km north-east from Alexandrov.
