= Ivanovskaya, Mishutinsky Selsoviet, Vozhegodsky District, Vologda Oblast =

Ivanovskaya Ивановская
- Village
- Location within Vologda Oblast Location within Russia
- Coordinates: 60°30′N 41°23′E
- Country: Russia
- Region: Vologda Oblast
- District: Vozhegodsky District
- Time zone: UTC+3:00

Ivanovskaya (Russian: Ивановская) is a rural locality (a village) in Mishutinskoye Rural Settlement, Vozhegodsky District, Vologda Oblast, Russia. The population was 1 as of 2002.

== Geography ==
The distance to Vozhega is 77.7 km, to Mishutinskaya is 21.7 km. Isakovo, Fatyanovo, Ozyorny are the nearest rural localities.
