= Ivanovskaya, Nyuksensky District, Vologda Oblast =

Ivanovskaya Ивановская
- Village
- Location within Vologda Oblast Location within Russia
- Coordinates: 60°32′N 44°11′E
- Country: Russia
- Region: Vologda Oblast
- District: Nyuksensky District
- Time zone: UTC+3:00

Ivanovskaya (Russian: Ивановская) is a rural locality (a village) in Nyuksenskoye Rural Settlement, Nyuksensky District, Vologda Oblast, Russia. The population was 9 as of 2002.

== Geography ==
Ivanovskaya is located 20 km north of Nyuksenitsa (the district's administrative centre) by road. Nakvasino is the nearest rural locality.
