= Ivanovskoye, Arkhangelsk Oblast =

Ivanovskoye Ивановское
- Selo
- Location within Arkhangelsk Oblast Location within Russia
- Coordinates: 61°54′N 42°02′E
- Country: Russia
- Region: Arkhangelsk Oblast
- District: Shenkursky District
- Time zone: UTC+3:00

Ivanovskoye (Russian: Ивановское) is a rural locality (a selo) in Shenkursky District, Arkhangelsk Oblast, Russia. The population was 57 as of 2010.

== Geography ==
It is located 47 km south-west from Shenkursk, on the Padenga River.
