= Ivanovskaya, Vytegorsky District, Vologda Oblast =

Ivanovskaya Ивановская
- Village
- Location within Vologda Oblast Location within Russia
- Coordinates: 60°36′N 36°48′E
- Country: Russia
- Region: Vologda Oblast
- District: Vytegorsky District
- Time zone: UTC+3:00

Ivanovskaya (Russian: Ивановская) is a rural locality (a village) in Almozerskoye Rural Settlement, Vytegorsky District, Vologda Oblast, Russia. The population was 22 as of 2002.

== Geography ==
Ivanovskaya is located 65 km southeast of Vytegra (the district's administrative centre) by road. Koybino is the nearest rural locality.
