= Ivanovskaya, Vashkinsky District, Vologda Oblast =

Ivanovskaya Ивановская
- Village
- Location within Vologda Oblast Location within Russia
- Coordinates: 60°39′N 37°59′E
- Country: Russia
- Region: Vologda Oblast
- District: Vashkinsky District
- Time zone: UTC+3:00

Ivanovskaya (Russian: Ивановская) is a rural locality (a village) and the administrative center of Ivanovskoye Rural Settlement, Vashkinsky District, Vologda Oblast, Russia. The population was 267 as of 2002. There are 4 streets.

== Geography ==
Ivanovskaya is located 48 km north of Lipin Bor (the district's administrative centre) by road. Savalikha is the nearest rural locality.
