= Ivanovskoye, Veprevsky Selsoviet, Vologodsky District, Vologda Oblast =

Ivanovskoye Ивановское
- Village
- Location within Vologda Oblast Location within Russia
- Coordinates: 59°25′N 39°23′E
- Country: Russia
- Region: Vologda Oblast
- District: Vologodsky District
- Time zone: UTC+3:00

Ivanovskoye (Russian: Ивановское) is a rural locality (a village) in Kubenskoye Rural Settlement, Vologodsky District, Vologda Oblast, Russia. The population was 3 as of 2002.

== Geography ==
The distance to Vologda is 72 km, to Kubenskoye is 16 km. Filkino, Molokovo, Virlovo are the nearest rural localities.
