= Ivanovskoye (Karinskoye Rural Settlement), Alexandrovsky District, Vladimir Oblast =

Ivanovskoye Ивановское
- Village
- Location within Vladimir Oblast Location within Russia
- Coordinates: 56°16′N 38°29′E
- Country: Russia
- Region: Vladimir Oblast
- District: Alexandrovsky District
- Time zone: UTC+3:00

Ivanovskoye (Russian: Ивановское) is a rural locality (a village) in Karinskoye Rural Settlement, Alexandrovsky District, Vladimir Oblast, Russia. The population was 19 as of 2010.

== Geography ==
The village is located on the Molokcha River, 19 km south-west from Bolshoye Karinskoye, 23 km south-west from Alexandrov.
