= Ivanovskaya, Tarnogsky District, Vologda Oblast =

Ivanovskaya Ивановская
- Village
- Location within Vologda Oblast Location within Russia
- Coordinates: 60°41′N 43°55′E
- Country: Russia
- Region: Vologda Oblast
- District: Tarnogsky District
- Time zone: UTC+3:00

Ivanovskaya (Russian: Ивановская) is a rural locality (a village) in Ilezskoye Rural Settlement, Tarnogsky District, Vologda Oblast, Russia. The population was 16 as of 2002.

== Geography ==
Ivanovskaya is located 36 km northeast of Tarnogsky Gorodok (the district's administrative centre) by road. Michurovskaya is the nearest rural locality.
