= Ivanovskaya, Syamzhensky District, Vologda Oblast =

Ivanovskaya Ивановская
- Village
- Location within Vologda Oblast Location within Russia
- Coordinates: 60°09′N 41°02′E
- Country: Russia
- Region: Vologda Oblast
- District: Syamzhensky District
- Time zone: UTC+3:00

Ivanovskaya (Russian: Ивановская) is a rural locality (a village) in Noginskoye Rural Settlement, Syamzhensky District, Vologda Oblast, Russia. The population was 11 as of 2002.

== Geography ==
Ivanovskaya is located 21 km north of Syamzha (the district's administrative centre) by road. Chaglotovo is the nearest rural locality.
