= Ivanovskaya, Nizhne-Vazhskoye Rural Settlement, Verkhovazhsky District, Vologda Oblast =

Ivanovskaya Ивановская
- Village
- Location within Vologda Oblast Location within Russia
- Coordinates: 60°47′N 42°06′E
- Country: Russia
- Region: Vologda Oblast
- District: Verkhovazhsky District
- Time zone: UTC+3:00

Ivanovskaya (Russian: Ивановская) is a rural locality (a village) in Nizhne-Vazhskoye Rural Settlement, Verkhovazhsky District, Vologda Oblast, Russia. The population was 4 as of 2002.

== Geography ==
The distance to Verkhovazhye is 7.5 km, to Klimushino is 2.5 km. Leonovskaya, Vakhrushevo, Klimushino, Borovina, Samovo are the nearest rural localities.
