= Ivanovskaya, Sibirsky Selsoviet, Verkhovazhsky District, Vologda Oblast =

Ivanovskaya Ивановская
- Village
- Location within Vologda Oblast Location within Russia
- Coordinates: 60°34′N 42°37′E
- Country: Russia
- Region: Vologda Oblast
- District: Verkhovazhsky District
- Time zone: UTC+3:00

Ivanovskaya (Russian: Ивановская) is a rural locality (a village) in Sibirskoye Rural Settlement, Verkhovazhsky District, Vologda Oblast, Russia. The population was 22 as of 2002.

== Geography ==
The distance to Verkhovazhye is 49.5 km, to Yeliseyevskaya is 0.5 km. Biryuchevskaya, Gniluzhskaya, Boyarskaya, and Yeliseyevskaya are the nearest rural localities.
