= List of specialist Churchill tank variants =

This is a list of specialist variants of the British Churchill tank.

== Churchill Oke ==
A Churchill Mark II or Mark III with a flamethrower. Developed for the amphibious raid on Dieppe in 1942, the Oke flamethrowing tank was named after its designer, Major J.M. Oke. The design was basically a Churchill tank fitted with the Ronson flamethrower equipment. A tank containing the flame fuel was fitted at the rear, with a pipe from it leading to the fixed angle mounting on the front hull to the left, leaving the hull machine gun unobstructed. Three (named Boar, Beetle and Bull) were present in the first wave at Dieppe; they were quickly lost and abandoned.

== Assault Vehicle Royal Engineers ==
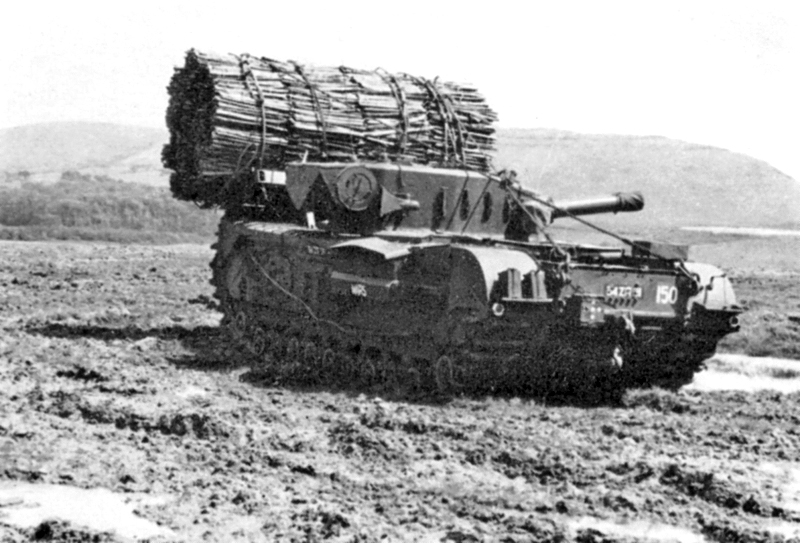
Churchill AVRE with fascine on tilt-forward cradle. This particular example is a post-WW2 AVRE on the MK VII chassis.

Proposed by a Canadian engineer as a result of experience from the Dieppe Raid, the Assault Vehicle Royal Engineers (AVRE) was a Churchill Mark III or IV equipped with the "Mortar, Recoiling Spigot, Mark II" (or Petard), a spigot mortar (Note: with a spigot mortar the round fits over a solid rod, in this case 29mm diameter, rather than inside a mortar barrel) that throws the 230 mm (9.1 in) 40 lb (18 kg) Bomb Demolition Number 1 ("Flying dustbin") with a 28-pound high-explosive warhead. The Petard, developed by MD1, was designed for the quick levelling of fortifications. The Petard was reloaded by traversing the turret to point front, slightly to the left, with the barrel directly over the co-driver's sliding hatch. The regular two piece co-driver's hatch was plated over, and a small sliding hatch was installed to allow access to the Petard. The Petard barrel would then be 'broken' vertically, and the co-driver would slide open his hatch. The co-driver would then push the projectile into the barrel. The barrel would then be closed, the Petard traversed back down, and the turret rotated back to its original position. The co-driver's hands were briefly exposed during the process.

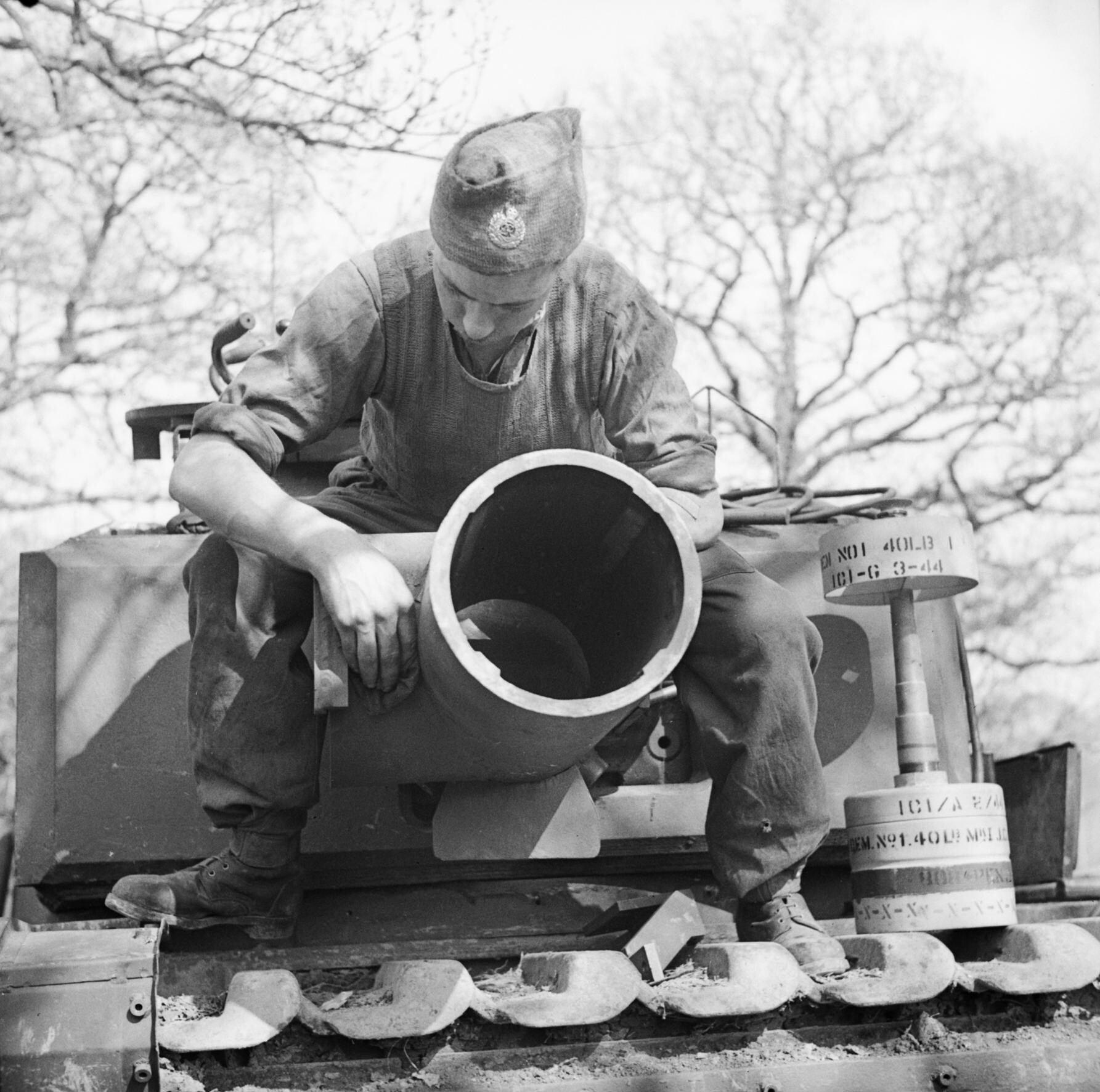
AVRE 230mm Petard Mortar and its ammunition (projectile standing on its flat nose, with tail facing up, at right)

The AVRE could also be equipped with numerous other attachments, such as the Small Box Girder bridge, which was carried at the front of the tank and laid across ditches or narrow rivers up to 30 feet wide, and the Canadian Indestructible Roller Device (CIRD), which was used to protect the tracks of a tank from mines. It could also carry fascines, which are large bundles of wood carried on the front of the tank and dropped into trenches to help the Churchill cross over them, devices to place explosive charges against obstacles, and bobbins: massive reels of canvas on drums that were unrolled in front of the Churchill to help it over soft terrain. They were used during the invasion of Normandy to help the Churchill over soft sand, and also served to leave a trackway for following vehicles.

By the time of the invasion of France in June 1944, 180 AVREs had been converted. They were first deployed in Normandy by the 79th Armoured Division on D-Day. They were extremely successful and served until the end of the war. A further 574 followed. While the driver came from the Royal Armoured Corps, the five other crew were drawn from the Royal Engineers. One of the RE crew was a demolitions NCO sapper responsible for priming the "Flying dustbin" and who led the crew when they dismounted from the tank to place demolition charges ("Wade" charges).

Other versions that did not see active service were equipped with anti-mine ploughs, mine rollers, or special demolition charges to destroy reinforced concrete walls.

Post-war, new Churchill AVREs were developed on the basis of a modified Churchill Mk VII armed with a breech-loading low velocity 165mm Royal Ordnance L9 demolition gun that fired a HESH round with about 40 lb (18 kg) of C4 explosive. The name of the AVRE was later changed to "Armoured Vehicle Royal Engineers".

== Armoured Recovery Vehicle ==
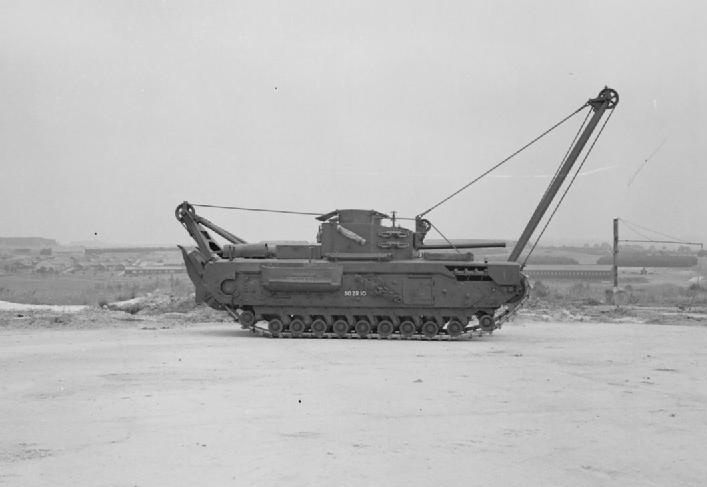
Churchill ARV Mk II with front jib erected

Two marks of armoured recovery vehicle were built from the Churchill

Mk I – A turretless Mk I with a jib that could be fitted at front or rear. Production began in early 1942

Mk II – A Churchill Mark III or Mark IV with a fixed turret/superstructure with a dummy gun. It was equipped for recovering other tanks from the battlefield. It mounted a front jib with a 7.5 ton capacity, a rear jib rated for 15 ton and a winch that could pull 25 tons. With just a three-man crew, there was enough room to carry the crew of the tank being recovered. Armament was a single Besa machine gun.

== Armoured Ramp Carrier ==
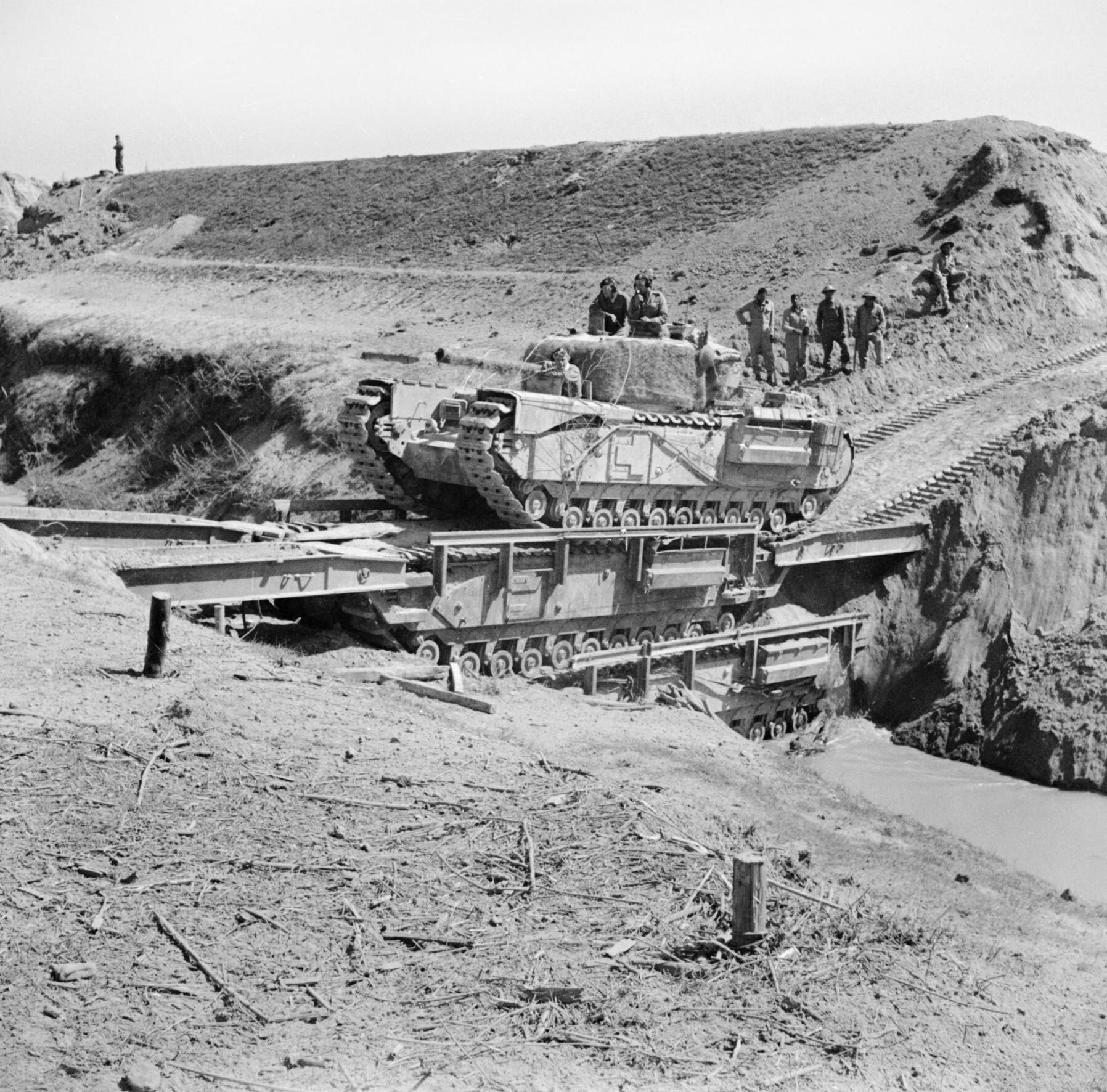
A Churchill tank of the North Irish Horse crossing the Senio in Italy on two stacked Churchill ARKs, April 1945

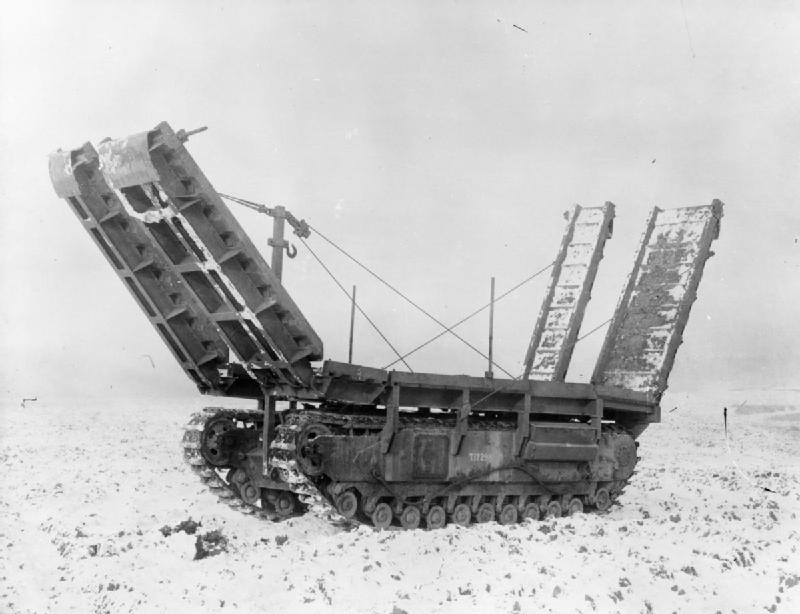
Churchill Ark Mk II (UK Pattern)

The Armoured Ramp Carrier (ARK) was a turretless Churchill with ramps at either end and trackways along the body to form a mobile bridge. Fifty of these were built on Mark II and Mark IV Churchills. The Link Ark or Twin Ark was two ARKs used side by side to give a wide crossing. The ramps on these were folding types giving a longer, 65 ft (20 m), crossing. The Twin-ARK was used for the post-war Conqueror heavy tank.

Ark Mk II had a wider, 4 ft (1.2 m) instead of the usual 2 ft (0.61 m), trackway on the left side so narrower vehicles could also use the ARK. These were conversions of the Ark Mark I in mid-1944. The "Italian Pattern" Ark Mk II (initially called "Octopus") was produced in Italy using US ramps on Churchill Mk III chassis and did not have trackways on the tank itself (vehicles drove on the tank's tracks).

"Lakeman Ark" was an experimental design for attacking very high obstacles. It was a turreted Churchill with the trackways built above the height of the turret, and long ramps at the rear.

== Bridgelayers ==
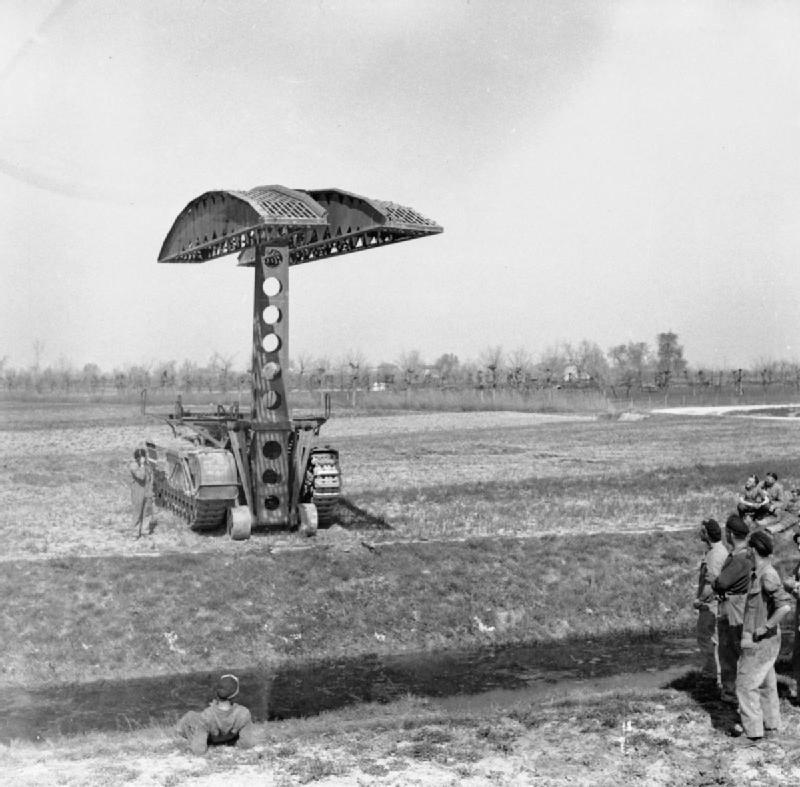
A Churchill bridgelayer of 51st Royal Tank Regiment in action during a demonstration in the Mezzano area, 30 March 1945.

The British already had experience of bridge-laying tanks with the Valentine tank and the Covenanter tank, and began work on a Churchill-based bridge-layer in 1942. The bridge ("Bridge, Tank, 30 ft, No.2 "), which could support a tank of 60 tons or be used by Class 40 wheeled traffic, was carried on top of a turretless Mk III or Mk VI chassis. When the obstacle was reached, an arm (driven by hydraulics in the tank) pivoted at the front of the tank and placed the bridge in position. The Churchill Mk VII was used with the No. 3 bridge from 1945 to 1946.

Bridges could also be deployed by the Churchill. "Skid Bailey" was a bridge formed from Bailey bridge parts on skids that was moved into position by one or two Churchill AVREs. Usual use was to bridge cratered roads while under fire.

The "Mobile Bailey Bridge" was a complete bridge suitable for class 40 traffic spanning a 70–80 ft (21–24 m) gap. The bridge itself was 150 ft (46 m) long with 10 ft (3.0 m) ramps at either end. This would be assembled at a safe distance from the gap and then pushed to the site by a Churchill AVRE with another aiding by towing from the front; the middle of the bridge was supported by Orolo unpowered tracked roller units. At the site the AVRE pushed the bridge out over the gap and then disconnected itself.

The "Mobile Brown Bridge" was an improvement on the Mobile Bailey. Named after a Canadian Royal Engineer in Italy, the Bailey bridge was carried on a Churchill which had its turret removed while an AVRE carried and pushed the rear of the bridge. With the first Churchill in position the AVRE would push the bridge out over the gap; an extra 20 ft tail on the bridge acted as a counterweight while the bridge was put in position.

The "Mobile Dalton Bridge", named after an RE officer, was a 140 ft (43 m) long Bailey bridge that was carried on an ARK while a second AVRE pushed. The process was the similar to the Brown Bridge. When the ARK reached the near side of the gap, it stopped and the AVRE pushed the bridge (riding on rollers on the top of the ARK) out over the gap. Once the far end of the bridge was on solid ground the AVRE disengaged and the ARK backed out under the bridge.

== Churchill Crocodile ==
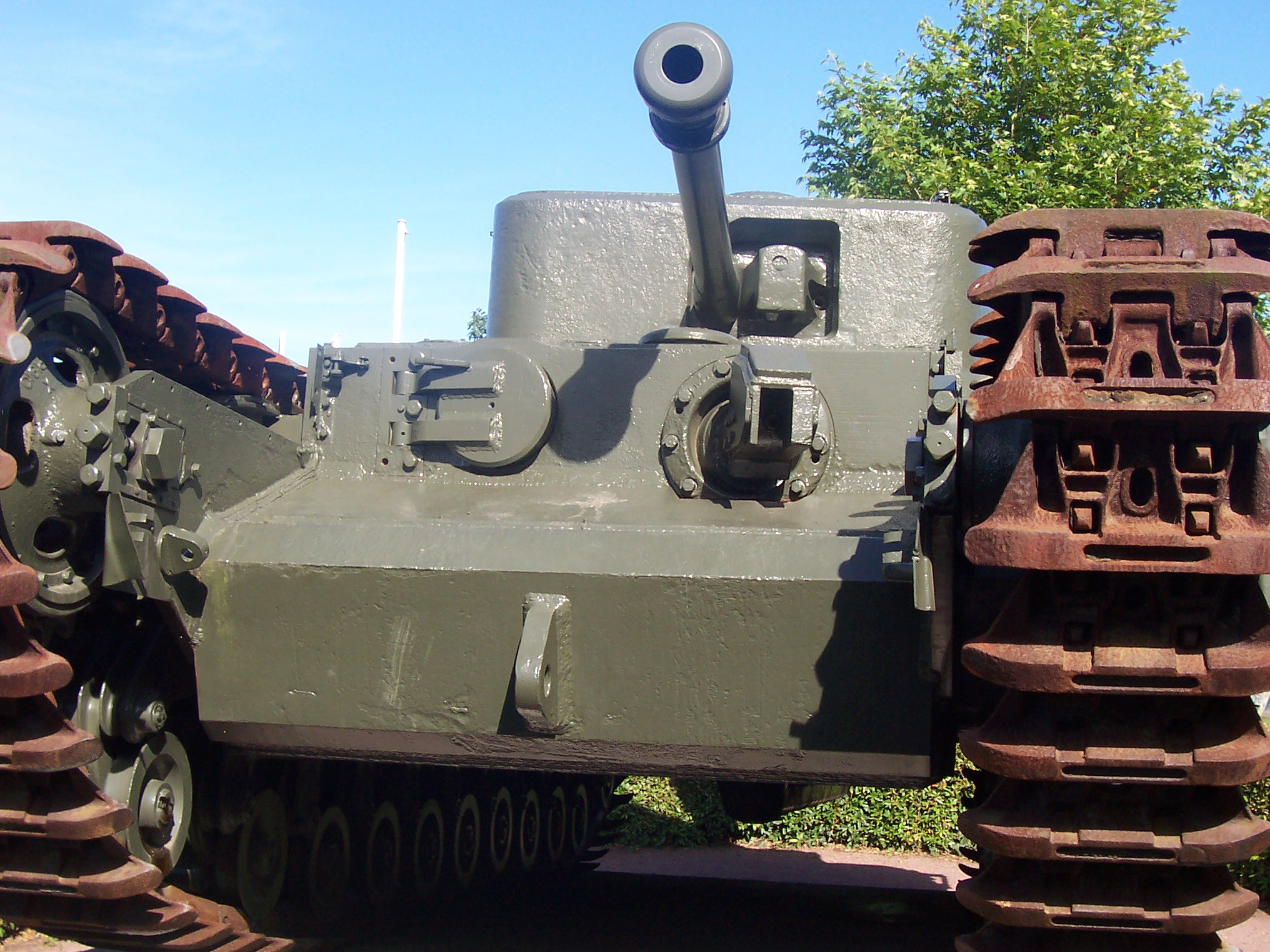
The flame projector on the Churchill Crocodile was in the hull machine gun ball-mount in the hull front plate leaving the main gun unaffected

The Churchill Crocodile was a Churchill VII that was converted by replacing the hull machine gun with a flamethrower projector. The fuel, and the compressed gas to drive it, was in an armoured wheeled trailer towed behind. It could fire several one second bursts out to a distance of over 150 yards. The Crocodile was one of "Hobart's Funnies" – another vehicle used by the 79th Armoured Division. A working example can still be seen at the Cobbaton Combat Collection in North Devon.

The combination of projector and trailer was produced as a kit that could be fitted to a Churchill; no more than 800 kits were produced.

== Gun Carrier, 3-inch, Mk I, Churchill (A22D) ==
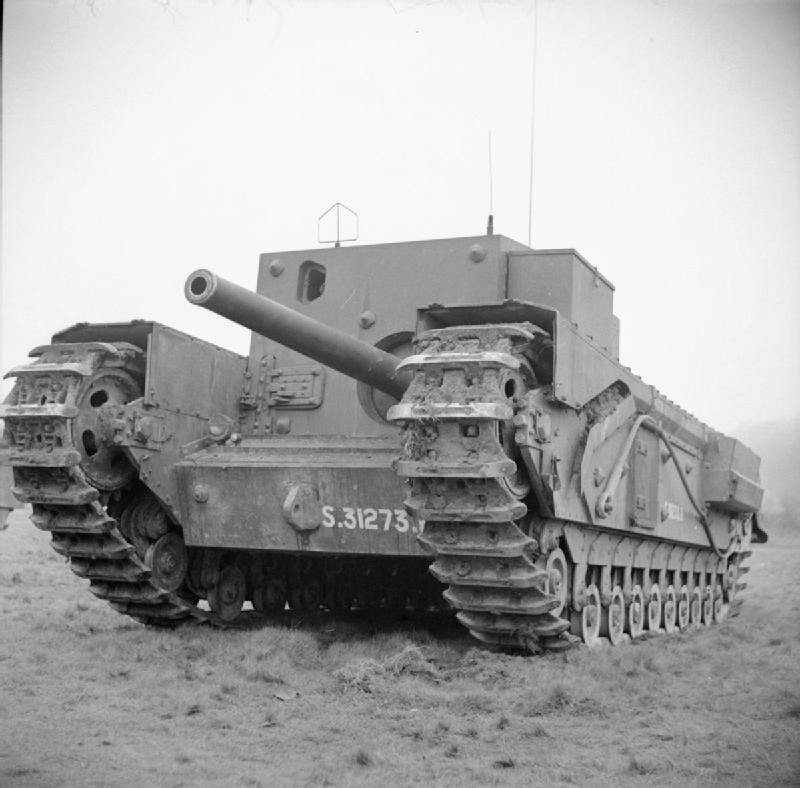
Churchill Gun Carrier in Dorset, 25 March 1943

Coming out of a General Staff request in 1941 to investigate fitting high velocity large calibre guns on infantry and cruiser tanks specifically for use against German tanks. Of the infantry tanks, neither the Churchill nor Valentine could mount a turret with a high velocity gun larger than the 6-pounder, but it was proposed that a fixed superstructure could carry a larger gun with limited traverse. The QF 3-inch 20 cwt anti-aircraft gun had been replaced by the 3.7-inch gun so these were selected and Vauxhall was provided with 100 guns and given the task of producing the vehicle.

The design used a fixed square thick plate superstructure with the gun in a ball mount low in the front next to the driver. The front was 88 mm (3.5 in), sides 76 mm (3.0 in) with overall weight of 39 tons. Internal stowage included a provision for 12 HE explosive rounds as well as the AP ones.

As an anti-tank gun, the 3-inch gun had a maximum range of 12,000 yards and was a bit more effective than the 57 mm QF 6-pounder at 1,000 yards but less than the 76.2 mm QF 17-pounder under development.

The pilot vehicles were ready for testing in early 1942 and found to be satisfactory. However, in order not to impede production of the Churchill (with the 6-pounder gun) the order was reduced to 24 vehicles. Vauxhall, the main designer and lead manufacturer of the Churchill was already set up for full production of the Gun Carrier with parts and armour ordered and complained with the result that the full order was re-instated before being cut back to 50. The 50 were built between July and November 1942 during which they were the subject of debate about whether they were artillery or tanks. The decision came down in favour of tank, and the Department of Tank Design asked for some changes; by that point in production these could not be incorporated. The prototype was built by Vauxhall and had a T-number, the other 49 by Beyer, Peacock & Company in Manchester, got WD numbers with an S prefix, the same as self-propelled guns. Requirements and tactics had in the meanwhile changed again to focus on the general purpose 75mm gun in the Churchill and a smaller proportion of 17-pounder tanks in use, of which work on the Cruiser Mk VIII Challenger was making progress.

None are known to have been used in combat as the 17-pounder anti-tank gun gave the British the necessary firepower. Some had the gun removed and converted to the "Snake" mine-clearing line charge device and used for trials and training of that in 1942–43.

One unrestored survivor is held at The Tank Museum, it had been used at Lydd Ranges as a target.

== Churchill Flail FV3902 or Toad ==
A 1950s mine-clearing flail tank built on a Churchill chassis using a Rolls-Royce Meteor engine to drive the flails.

== Goat ==
A chargelayer, like the Double Onion device.

== Great Eastern Ramp ==
A much larger, longer and higher trackway ramp than the ARK for crossing 60 ft (18 m). The 25-foot-long front ramps were launched into position with rockets. Ten built and two delivered in 1945 but not used in action.

== Kangaroo ==
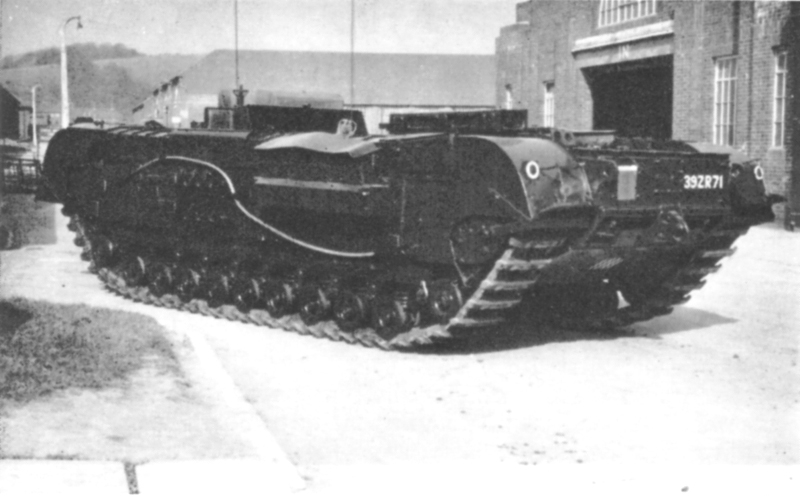
A postwar Churchill Kangaroo viewed from the left rear

The Churchill Kangaroo was a turretless Churchill hull converted to an armoured personnel carrier.
