= M728 combat engineer vehicle =

M728 Combat Engineer Vehicle
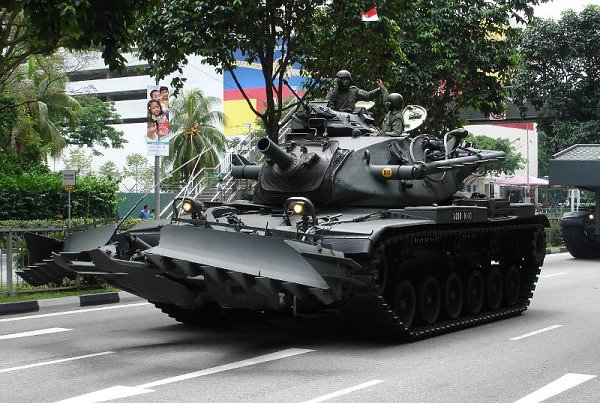
- A D7 mine plough–equipped M728 Combat Engineer Vehicle (CEV) of the Singapore Army
- Type: Military engineering vehicle
- Place of origin: United States

Service history
- In service: 1965–present
- Used by: See operators
- Wars: Cold War; Vietnam War; Gulf War; Bosnian Implementation Force; Stabilization Force in Bosnia and Herzegovina

Production history
- Designer: US Army Engineer Research & Development Laboratories
- Designed: 1963
- Manufacturer: Detroit Arsenal Tank Plant, Warren, Michigan; Anniston Army Depot, Alabama (final assembly)
- Unit cost: M728: US$297,900 (1974) (equivalent to $1,469,937 in 2024)
- Produced: M728: 1965–1972; M728A1: 1982–1987
- No. built: 312 (all variants)
- Variants: See variants

Specifications
- Mass: M728 Combat Loaded: 52.2 short tons (47.4 t); M728A1 Combat Loaded: 53.2 short tons (48.3 t)
- Length: Overall: 8.83 metres (29 ft 0 in)
- Width: 3.66 m (12 ft 0 in)
- Height: 3.3 m (10 ft 10 in)
- Crew: 4 (commander, gunner, loader, driver)
- Armor: Upper Hull Glacis M728: 3.67 in (93 mm) at 65° 8.68 in (220 mm) LoS; M728A1: 4.29 in (109 mm) at 65° 10.15 in (258 mm) LoS Turret Front; M728/M728A1: equals 10 in (250 mm)
- Main armament: Main gun: 1× 165mm M135 (30 rounds)
- Secondary armament: Coaxial machine gun: 1× 7.62mm M240 machine gun (2,000 rounds); Commander cupola M19: 1× 12.7mm M85 machine gun (600 rounds)
- Engine: Continental (now General Dynamics) AVDS-1790-2DR V12, air-cooled twin-turbo diesel engine 750 horsepower (560 kW)
- Power/weight: 14.1 hp/t
- Payload capacity: A-frame crane boom: 9.0 short tons (18,000 lb) hoisting/lifting capacity Winch: 11.0 short tons (22,000 lb) pulling capacity
- Transmission: CD-850-6A 2 speeds forward, 1 reverse
- Suspension: Torsion bar suspension
- Ground clearance: 463 mm (1 ft 6.2 in)
- Fuel capacity: 1,457 litres (320 imp gal; 385 US gal)
- Operational range: 280 miles (450 km)
- Maximum speed: 30 miles per hour (48 km/h)

The M728 Combat Engineer Vehicle (CEV) is a full-tracked vehicle used for breaching, obstacle removal, and pioneering operations. Production commenced in 1965 and ceased in 1987. A total of 312 of all variants of these armored engineer vehicles were produced.

== Design ==
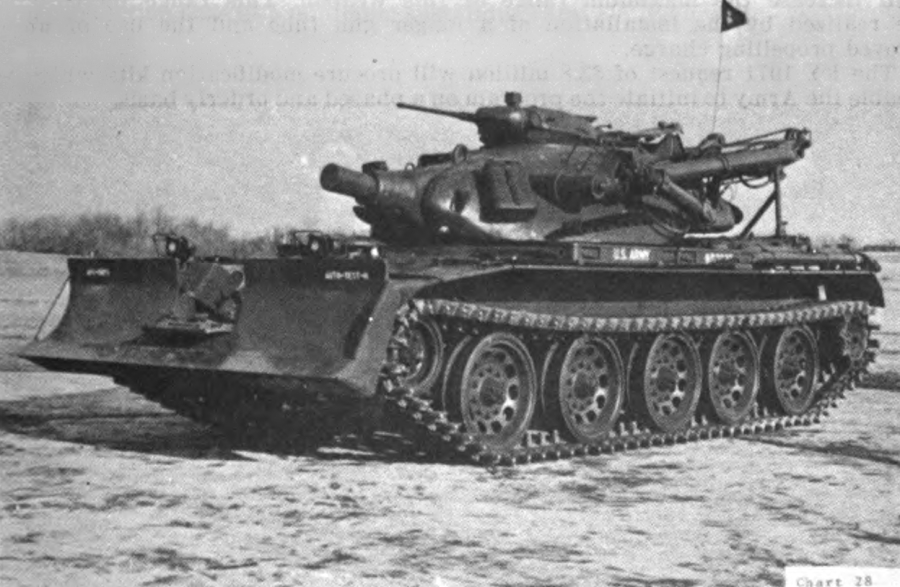
Combat engineer vehicle T118E1

=== Development and production ===
Prototype development began in the late 1940s at Ft. Belvoir, VA by the US Army Engineer Research & Development Laboratories in conjunction with Chrysler. These early T39 Demolition Tank prototypes were based on the M26 using several different modified turrets, demolition guns and heavy mortars. The T118 prototypes used the T95 hull beginning in 1960. Both prototypes went through extensive testing at the Aberdeen Proving Grounds through 1963 and final trials in 1964. The T118E1, with a modified M60A1 turret was then accepted into service as the M728 in 1965 and achieved operational capability in 1968. The turrets for the M728 were manufactured at Chrysler Corp.'s Detroit Arsenal Tank Plant, Warren, Michigan. Final assembly and mating to the vehicle hulls was performed at Anniston Army Depot in Alabama. Initial production of the M728 was from 1965 to 1972. Many of the M782A1s were former M60A2 tanks converted to M728A1s from 1982 to 1987. All M728A1s were converted and assembled at the Anniston Army Depot under contract with General Dynamics Land Systems with a total of 312 of all variants produced.

=== Description ===
The M728 is a full-tracked combat engineer vehicle designed to provide maximum ballistic protection for the crew. It is a heavily armed derivative of the M60 series tank modified to provide a mobile and maneuverable weapon for combat support of ground troops and vehicles. The M728 vehicle is used for breaching, obstacle removal, and pioneering operations. Although the M728 consists of a tank hull and a short-barreled turret, it is not a tank and should not be routinely used against enemy tanks. It is an excellent heavy assault support vehicle when used as part of a combined engineer-infantry team. The CEV is issued two per Engineer Company in the Heavy Division, two per Engineer Company in Corps (Mechanized), three per Engineer Company in Armor/Infantry Separate Brigades and three per Engineer Company in the Armored Cavalry Regiment.

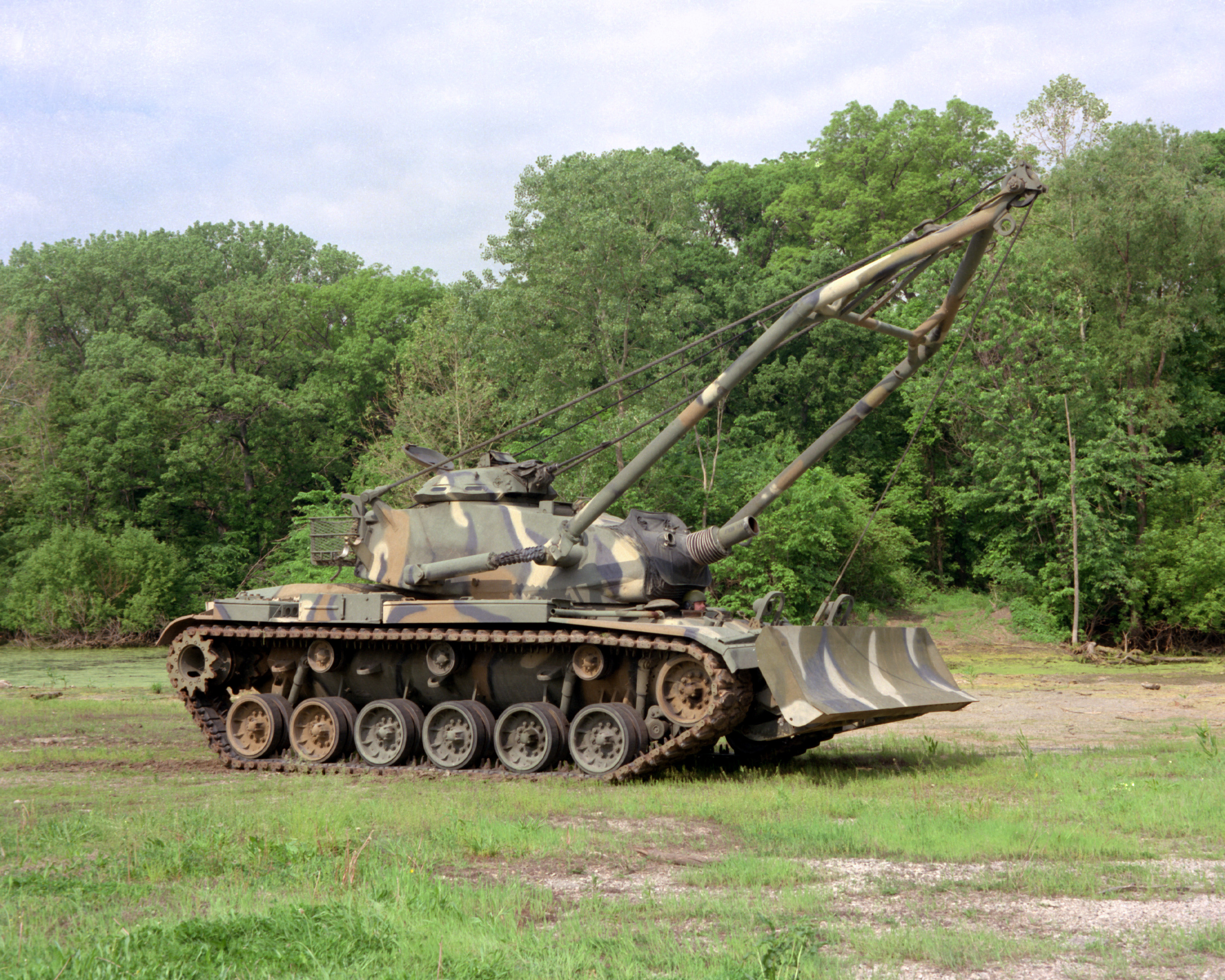
The M728 CEV with an M9 dozer blade assembly and the A-frame crane boom deployed

It is usually equipped with either a hydraulically operated M9 dozer blade assembly or a D7 mine plough. The M9 dozer blade Assembly is used for clearing the way, filling depressions, leveling ground and for other purposes. The D7 mine plough is a V-shaped plough that performs countermine activities by lifting surface laid mines and pushing them to the side as the vehicle moves forward. They are controlled by the driver. A winch and retractable A-frame crane are mounted on the turret for lifting, carrying and winching operations. The hull front contains the driver's compartment, controls and instruments. The hull rear contains the engine, transmission, fuel tanks, and related automotive components. The turret has positions for the commander, gunner, and loader. The vehicle is also equipped with an NBC protection system for the crew. It can produce a limited smokescreen by dumping raw diesel fuel into the exhaust system to visually obscure the area around the vehicle as well as provide a limited vehicle recovery capability.

=== Armament ===
The vehicle is armed with a 165mm M135 short-barreled demolition gun with 30 rounds of HEP (high explosive, plastic) ammunition. The M135 is a license-built copy of the 165 mm L9A1 gun that was used on the British Army's FV4003 Centurion Mk.5 AVRE (Armoured Vehicle Royal Engineers) tank. Depending on the usage, the gun can be depressed and elevated against targets up to an effective range of 925 metres (1,012 yd). The gun's primary purpose is for clearing defensive fixtures and obstacles, such as walls, fences, roadblocks and bunkers, or for destroying buildings and is generally not meant to be for use in anti-personnel or anti-tank warfare. The pushing and heaving effects caused by the HEP round's base detonating fuze and large amount of explosive can demolish barriers and knock down walls. One round creates a 1-foot (0.3 m) diameter hole in a 7-inch (178 mm) thick reinforced concrete wall. The round's effects against bunkers and field fortifications are dramatic, often crushing or smashing entire walls. The gun fires two types of fixed ammunition, the M123E1 HEP Round and the M623 Target Practice Round. The main gun has a coaxial 7.62×51mm NATO M240E1 machine gun, with 2,000 rounds of 7.62mm ammunition. In addition, a .50 caliber M85 machine gun is mounted in the commander's cupola; this has 600 rounds of ammunition.

== Service history ==
=== United States ===
It was first deployed in 1968 during the Vietnam War. The M728 was used in fire support, base security, counter ambush fire, direct assault of fortified positions, and limited reconnaissance by fire. They were also deployed at this time to West Germany during the Cold War to support combat engineer operations and participated in annual Reforger exercises until 1991.

During mine-clearing operations in the Gulf War, the M1 MCRS was found to be cumbersome, heavy and hard to transport. In addition, since they were originally designed for the firmer soil conditions of Europe, its rollers were unsuitable for the softer soil of the desert. Instead of rolling, they often merely skidded, pushing soil in front of them until they bogged down. A mine clearing-rake was specially designed and fabricated for the CEV in operations Desert Shield and Desert Storm. The full-width rake allows the CEV to clear minefields in non-cohesive, granular soils such as sand. The mine-clearing rake is a V-shaped tined plough that performs countermine activities by lifting buried mines with its tines and pushing them to the side as the vehicle moves forward. Attached to any M728 CEV's D7 mine plough or M60 series tank via a M9 dozer blade assembly, the mine-clearing rake also uses an aluminum skid shoe which protrudes from the front of the tines and allows the rake to maintain a consistent plowing depth. It clears a path 180 in (4,600 mm) wide, accommodating heavy tanks and other armored vehicles. It weighs 4,000 lb (1,800 kg) and is easily assembled and installed.

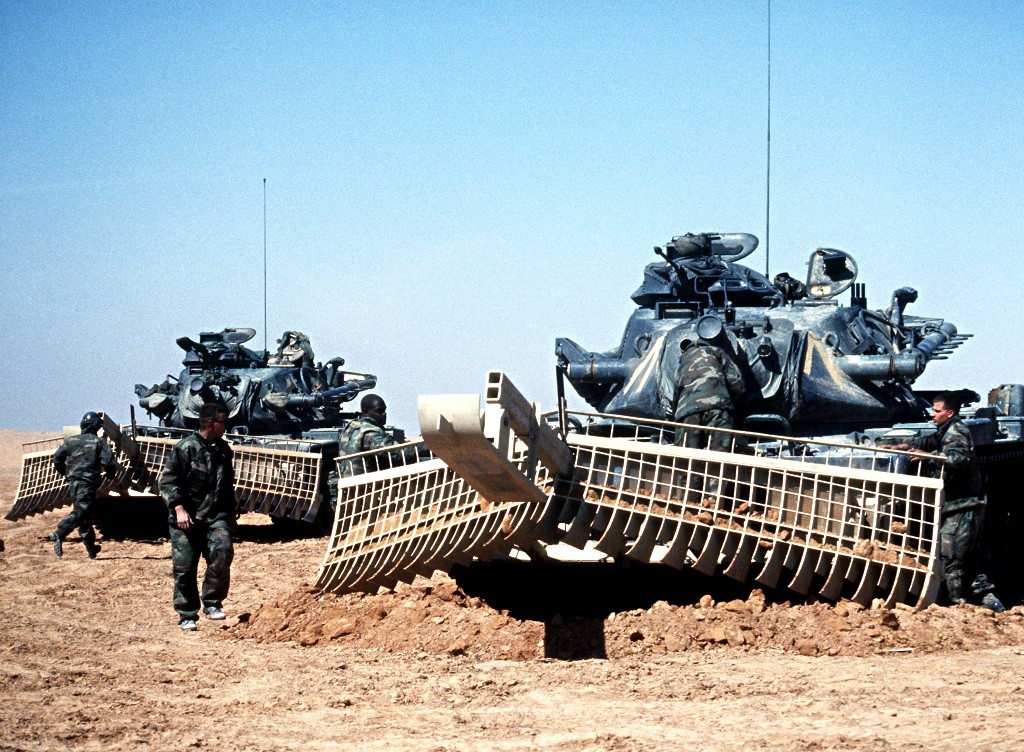
M728A1s of 72nd Engineering Company, 24th Infantry Division, inspecting a mine-clearing rake, Operation Desert Storm 18 February 1991.

They were active during the Desert Shield phase of the Gulf War in clearing suspected minefields and in creating temporary defensive fighting positions and staging areas in the deserts near the Iraqi Saudi border. The M728A1s of the 24th Infantry Division and US XVIII Airborne Corps breached the openings for the "left hook" flanking of Iraqi forces during the Desert Storm phase of the war, but they were left behind once they began the pursuit and exploitation phase of the operation. A CEV of the 6th Battalion, 6th Regiment, 1st Armored Division, fired 21 M123E1 rounds into the stubbornly defended town of Al Busayyah: "That totally destroyed all the resistance in the town," according to the battalion commander. After the cease-fire, CEV guns were used to break up coke piles that had formed around approximately 20% of the burning oil wells in Kuwait. According to the US Army, the guns reduced the time to break up coke formation from as long as two days to 15 minutes. Commanders were unanimous in their opinion that the engineer force needed an M1 chassis based vehicle for heavy breaching and gap crossing equipment to fully support the M1 Abrams tank and M2 Bradley infantry fighting vehicles.

Three M728CEVs were temporally acquired for use by the United States Department of Justice's FBI and ATF SWAT teams to conduct Operation Showtime during the 1993 Siege of the Branch Davidian Complex near Waco, Texas. They were provided to the ATF by Task Force Six of the Texas Army National Guard from Ft. Hood. They were used to destroy perimeter fences and structures and to crush automobiles to prevent escape from the compound.

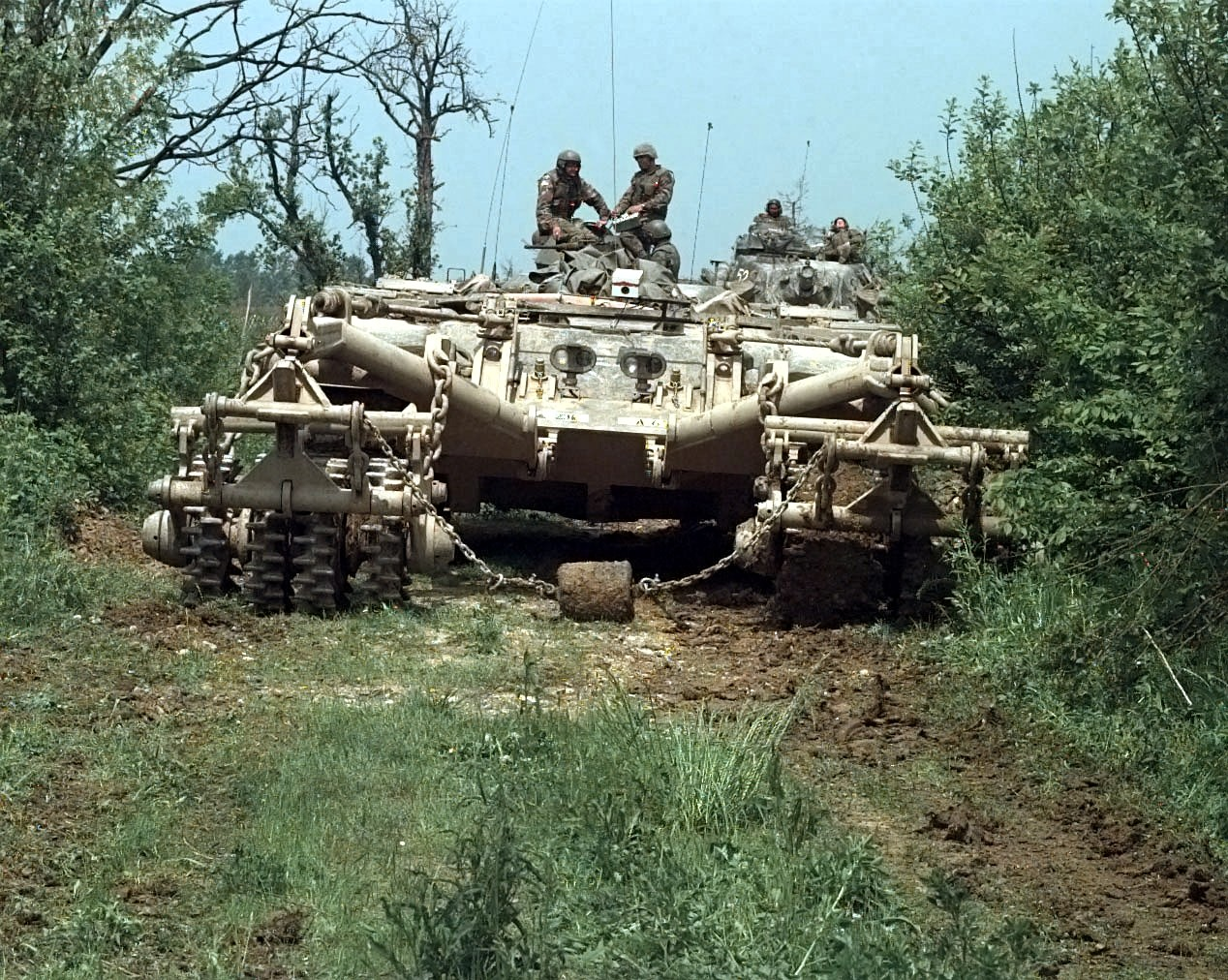
An M60 Panther MCDV armored mine-clearing vehicle prepares to lead a convoy down a road in Bosnia and Herzegovina, 16 May 1996. Note the M728 in the background.

US Army M728A1s were deployed in support of the United Nations' Resolution, NATO led Implementation Force (IFOR) peacekeeping force in the former Yugoslavia in December 1995. Their initial mission was to assist in protecting and demining the international airport at Sarajevo. By September 1996 their mission had expanded to include road clearance, bunker demolition and protecting humanitarian aid and assist relief delivery in the whole of Bosnia and Herzegovina, as well as to help protect civilian refugees when required by the Red Cross. Task Force Eagle assumed control of its area of responsibility during a ceremony with United Nations forces at Eagle Base in Tuzla on December 20 consisting of elements of the 1st Armored Division and its supporting elements from the U.S. V Corps and were joined by forces from twelve other nations. During the campaign in Bosnia, at least three M60 Panther MCDVs were used in conjunction with the M728. The Panther would lead the convoy followed by the M728. The Panther operator would control the vehicle from the M728 via a remote control system during road clearing operations. There was a Closed Circuit Television (CCTV) camera system attached to the front of the Panther so the remote-operator could see where the tank was going through a screen on the remote control unit. The radio control signal was received by a long antenna protruding from the engine deck. The M728 also provided a good secondary clearing action by use of its bulldozer blade as it followed the Panther. It would skim the trail cleared by the Panther pushing away debris and keeping the route clear for other following vehicles, also smoothing out the road surface and could be used for filling in craters left by any exploding mines or ordnance. The CEV was also useful for quickly recovering the Panther should it become stuck, and its crane allowed easy loading and unloading of the mine roller onto transport vehicles. The 1st Armored Division was relieved by the 1st Infantry Division and returned to Germany in November 1996.

The M728 has been determined by the US Army to be inadequate to fully support the M1 Abrams and M2 Bradley, also cited were the rising costs to maintain and difficulty in acquiring parts for a low density piece of equipment and was retired from combat use with no clear replacement in 2000. In the late 1990s, the Army decided it could not afford to continue developing complicated, maintenance-heavy vehicles for this purpose. The M1 Grizzly Combat Mobility Vehicle (CMV) was canceled in 2001, and the prototype developed never went into full production.

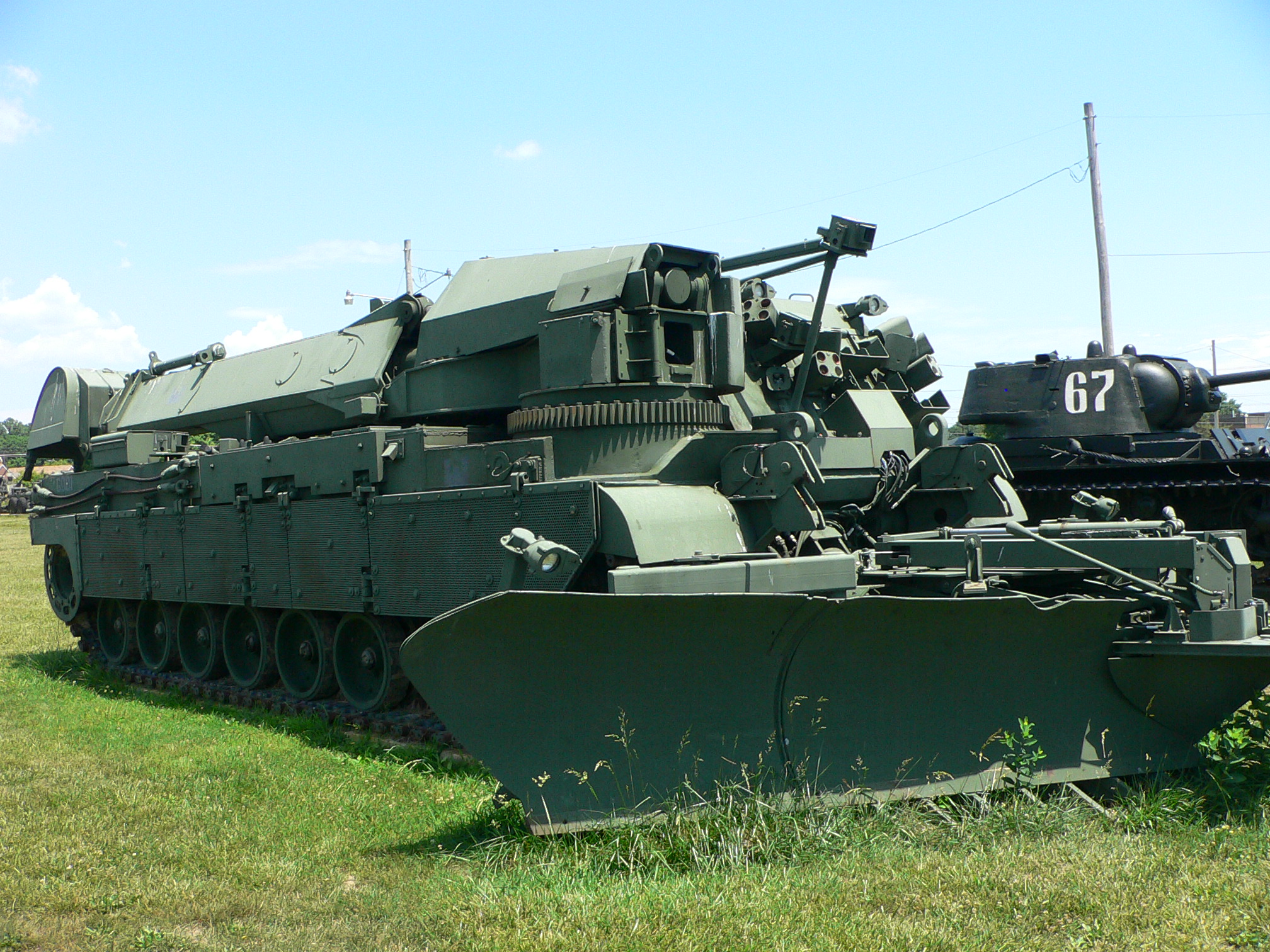
M1Grizzly Combat Mobility Vehicle (CMV)

The Marine Corps however persisted and funded its own development and testing of the M1150 assault breacher vehicle. As of 2009 it is still used by the Army National Guard and US Army Reserve. In 2018 the US Army began to phase out the M728 from service with the Army Reserves and National Guard replacing them with the M1150 and is to be completely withdrawn from US service by 2024.

=== Other users ===
The eight M728s formerly in service with the Singapore Army were retired in 2016, having been replaced by the Leopard 2-based AEV 3 Kodiak armoured engineer vehicle (AEV).

The Spanish Army began the Programa Coraza – 2000 ("Program Armor – 2000") in March 1995. One of its goals was the development of a new combat engineer vehicle, the CZ-10/25E Alacran, based on the M60A1 hull and converted from former M60A3 MBTs with upgrades to the engine. It has an external appearance similar to the M728 CEV, but without the 165 mm demolition gun, being replaced by a special backhoe. It also has a front-mounted dozer blade and is armed with a machine gun. An initial batch of 38 vehicles have been produced in close liaison with engineers at the Army Logistics Command.

Portugal retired its M728CEVs in 2013.

As of 2015 they continue in service with the armies of a few other countries including Morocco and Saudi Arabia.

== Variants ==
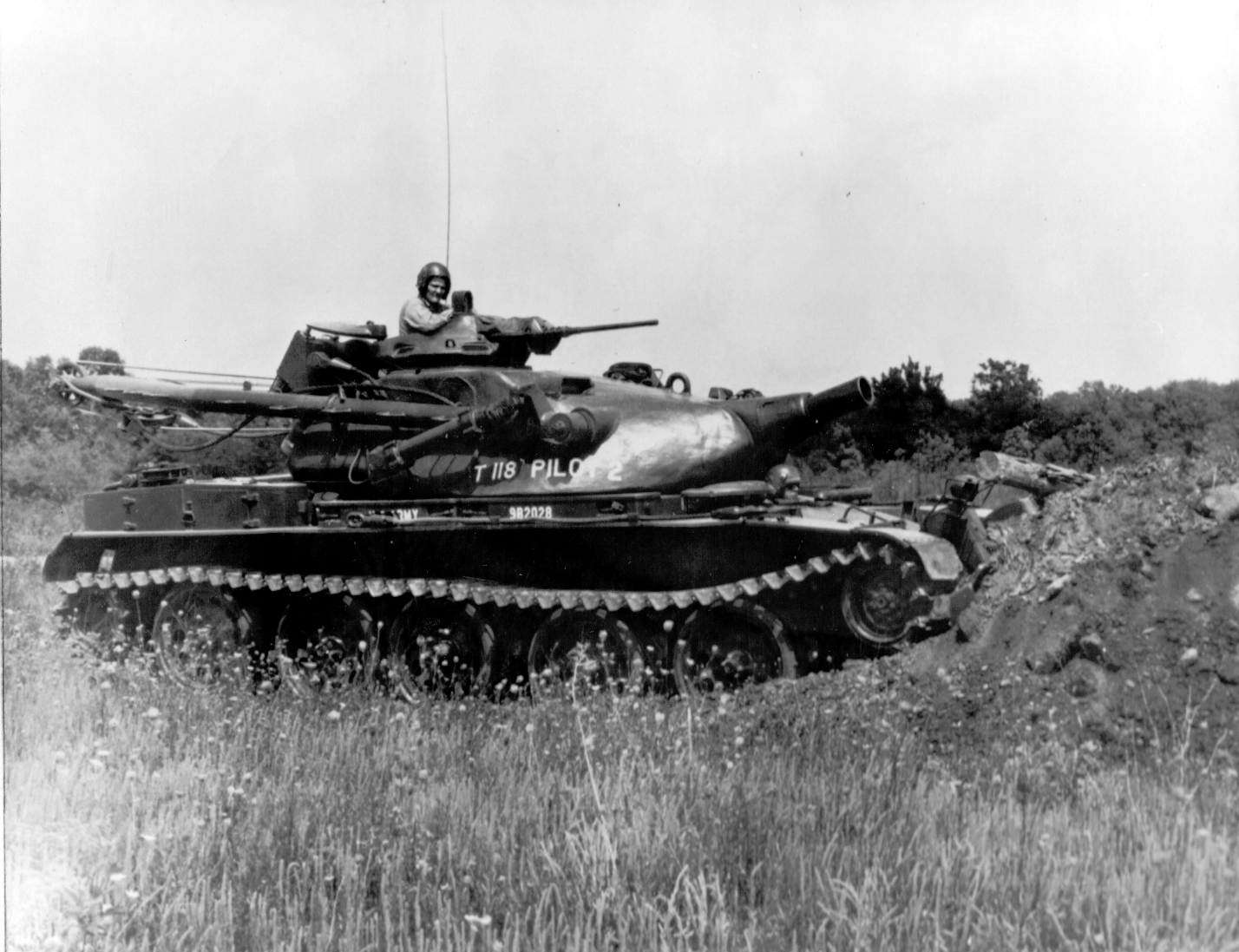
T118 CEV Prototype pilot #2 circa 1962

- T118E1 – prototype for the M728 based on the T95 hull
- M728 – version mated to the M60 hull
- M728A1 – version mated to the M60A1 RISE hull
- M60 CZ-10/25E Alacran – Spanish Army variant converted from upgraded M60A1 hulls

Additional equipment

- M9 bulldozer kit for the M60 series (SNL G306) The M9 bulldozer installed on the M728 will increase the vehicle's weight by 4.45 tons (4.04 metric tons). It is controlled by the driver.
- M58 mine-clearing line charge (MICLIC) : The system consists of the launcher mounted on a M200A1 tracked trailer, an M147 firing kit, an M58A4 line charge and a 5-inch (127 mm) Mk22 Mod 4 rocket. The line charge is 350 feet (107 meters) long and contains 5 pounds (2.27 kg) per linear foot of C-4 explosive. In the event a MICLIC fails to detonate normally, it can be manually activated by time-delay fuses every few feet along the length of it. The MICLIC can provide a rapidly emplaced lane through mine and wire obstacles up to 14 meters wide and 100 meters deep. Mines containing magnetic or other non-pressure-sensitive fuses may escape destruction from the blast overpressure, but will usually be uncovered and blown to the side out of the lane. Armored vehicles avoid mines by keeping the left track in the cleared centerline. Cleared lanes should also be proofed with plows or rollers when available.
- M1 mine-clearing roller system (MCRS): Installed on the front of the tank through a removable adapter, it provides the capability for neutralization of anti-tank (AT) land mines, which are buried or laid on the surface, in the track path of the vehicle. The MCRS consists of two roller banks with two push-arm assemblies. Each roller bank has four rollers, which apply ground pressure higher than that exerted by the tank. This principle ensures the explosion of pressure fused anti tank mines, which would otherwise explode under the track itself. Additionally an anti-magnetic mine activating device (AMMAD) is connected between the two roller banks. The system weighs 10 short tons (9.07 metric tons).
- D7 surface mine plow (SMP): A track-width plow designed to skim the surface of a flat roadway or trail, not to defeat buried mines. It is controlled by the driver.
- Track-width mine plow (TWMP): Uses a raking action to clear a safe path by bringing concealed or buried mines and improvised explosive devices (IEDs) to the surface and moving them wide and clear of the vehicle. It can be fitted with a AMMAD to counter magnetic influence fused mines.
- Full Width Mine Rake (FWMR) : A rake assembly for unearthing and disposing of buried and surface laid mines in sand and loose earth. Specifically designed for use in operations Desert Shield and Desert Storm.

== Operators ==
- Oman – three in service with the Royal Army of Oman
- Morocco – six in service with the Royal Moroccan Army are still in service as of 2016
- Saudi Arabia – 15 in service with the Saudi Arabian Army
- Spain – 38 M60CZ-10/25E Alacran
- United States – Retired from combat use in 2000, 262 are relegated to the Army National Guard and US Army Reserve (as of 2007) Phased replacement with the M1150 assault breacher vehicle starting in 2018.

=== Former operators ===
- Portugal – three were in service with the Portuguese Army (retired in 2013)
- Singapore – 8 formerly in service with the Singapore Army (and most likely stored in reserve) as of 2016

== See also ==
- M60 tank
- List of U.S. military vehicles by model number
- G-numbers (SNL G303)
- Korean axe murder incident § Operation Paul Bunyan
