= Mine roller =

Device mounted on a tank that clears mines by detonating them

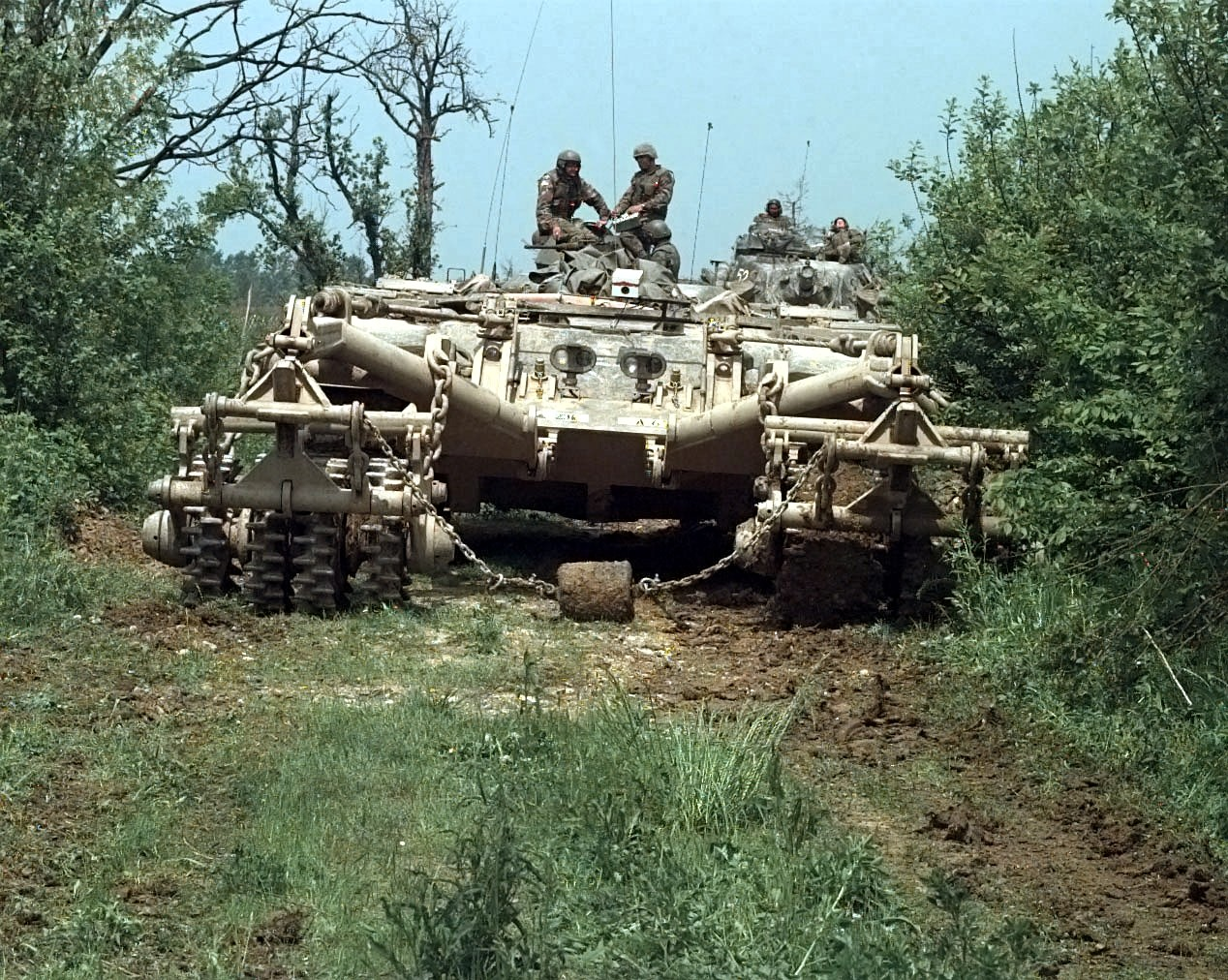
A US Army Panther mine-clearing variant of the M60 tank. It is fitted with mine rollers and operated by remote control.

A mine roller or mine trawl is a demining device mounted on a tank or armoured personnel carrier, designed to detonate anti-tank mines. It allows combat engineers to clear a lane through a minefield which is protected by enemy fire.

The device is usually composed of a fork or two push arm assemblies fitted to the front of a tank hull, with two banks of rollers that can be lowered in front of the tank's tracks. Each roller bank has several heavy wheels studded with short projecting steel girders, which apply a higher ground pressure than the tank's tracks. This ensures the explosion of pressure-fused anti-tank mines, which would otherwise explode under the track itself.

== History ==
During the interwar period, the British were the first to work on mine clearing devices. After being removed from the Dover Patrol and joining the newly created Tank Board, Admiral Sir Reginald Bacon designed the Invicta Roller, which was a pair of steamrollers rigged in front of a Mark V tank. It was a cumbersome design and the rollers had to be re-rigged every time a mine detonated beneath them, making the clearing process slower and more complicated than "crawling along the ground with a bayonet".

In 1937, the concept was revived with sprung rollers mounted in front of a Covenanter tank. When the rollers detonated a mine, the explosion simply pushed the rollers up against the spring and then rebounded back to the ground, allowing the tank to continue mine clearing without interruptions. This design would become the AMRA (Anti-Mine Roller Attachment), which would be used in their Matilda II, Valentine, and Crusader tanks in the North African campaign during World War II. The rollers only covered the width of each track rather than clearing a tank-width path for subsequent vehicles and troops. To these were added a Churchill tank with the evocatively named Canadian Indestructible Roller Device (CIRD). The British used mine rollers to detect the presence of minefields and then used mine flails for the clearance.

After great difficulties caused by minefields in the Winter War against Finland, the Soviet Red Army assigned P. M. Mugalev at the Dormashina Factory in Nikolayev to design a mine-clearing vehicle. Prototypes were tested based on the T-28 medium tank in 1940. Development was interrupted by the start of World War II, but resumed in 1942. T-60 and KV tank chassis underwent trials, but only the T-34 was deemed to have a sufficiently robust transmission and clutch.

Experimental detachments of PT-34 mine roller tanks were formed in May 1942, and saw action at Voronezh in August. The first Independent Engineer Tank Regiment with eighteen mine rollers was fielded in October 1943. At least five regiments were formed during the war.

The PT-34's huge roller fork was semi-permanently mounted on a T-34 or T-34-85 tank. The rollers were usually removed for travel, and only installed for mine clearing operations. Adaptations for later tanks consisted of two lighter arms. The Mugalev system was adopted by U.S. and Israeli forces in the 1980s.

The Germans worked on several designs mounted on different tanks, but none ever entered service before the end of WWII. As early as of 1939, they worked on a radio-controlled miniature tank with a set of toothed rollers mounted behind it. While prototypes were tested, development took a different turn and it ended up becoming the Goliath tracked mine. Another German prototype was the Räumer S: a 130 tonne articulated vehicle with two pairs of 2.7 m (8 ft 10 in) diameter roller wheels, each one powered by a Maybach engine to cover as much ground as possible. Heavily armoured, it was impervious to any anti-tank mine, but it was too heavy to cross most bridges. The prototype was captured by the Allies at a Krupp testing ground at the end of the war.

Throughout 1942 and 1943, the United States Army Ordnance Department experimented with several mine roller designs. Their limitations were excessive weight, slow speeds, and frequent breakdowns. After testing over 15 different designs, the US Army adopted the T1E3 Mine Exploder, which was first fielded by early 1944. It was attached to the M4 Sherman medium tank and was nicknamed Aunt Jemima because of its pancake-like appearance. It had two sets of five disc rollers, 10 feet (3.0 meters) in diameter each.

== Post-WWII ==
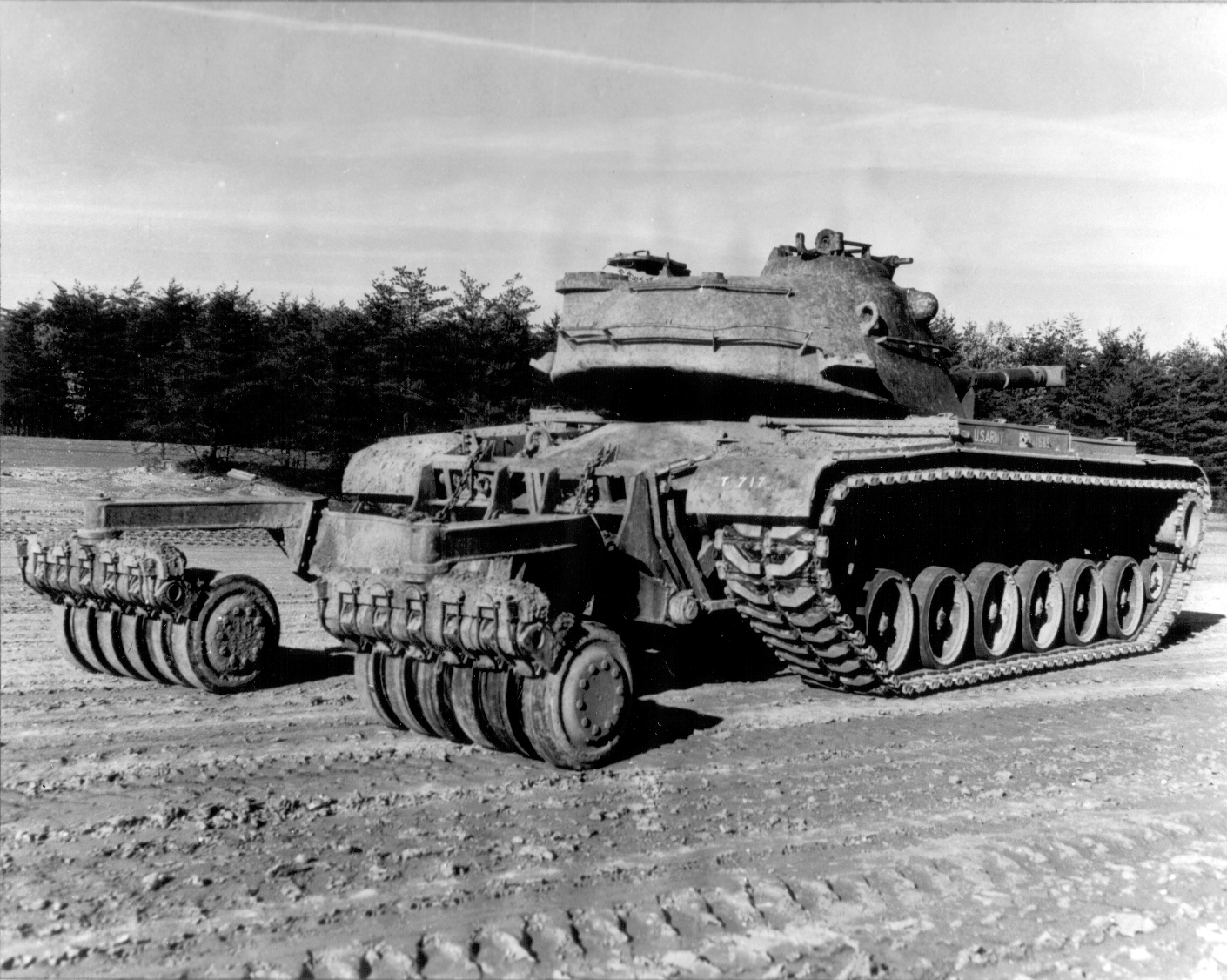
During the Vietnam War, the United States tried mounting Ensure 202 expendable mine rollers on an M48 tank.

Since 1945, a number of countries have developed mine rollers including:

- Russia
  - Stankomash – TMT.
- United Kingdom
  - Armtrac Limited – Armtrac Roller: capable of operating at 50 km/h.
  - Pearson Engineering – Light Weight Mine Roller (LWMR).
- United States
  - Ensure 202: Vietnam-War-era mine roller for M48 Patton tank.
  - Axion Corporation: fits to M1 Abrams tank.

== See also ==
- Mine plow
- Military engineering vehicle
