= High-explosive squash head =

Ammunition type

High explosive squash head
(HESH)

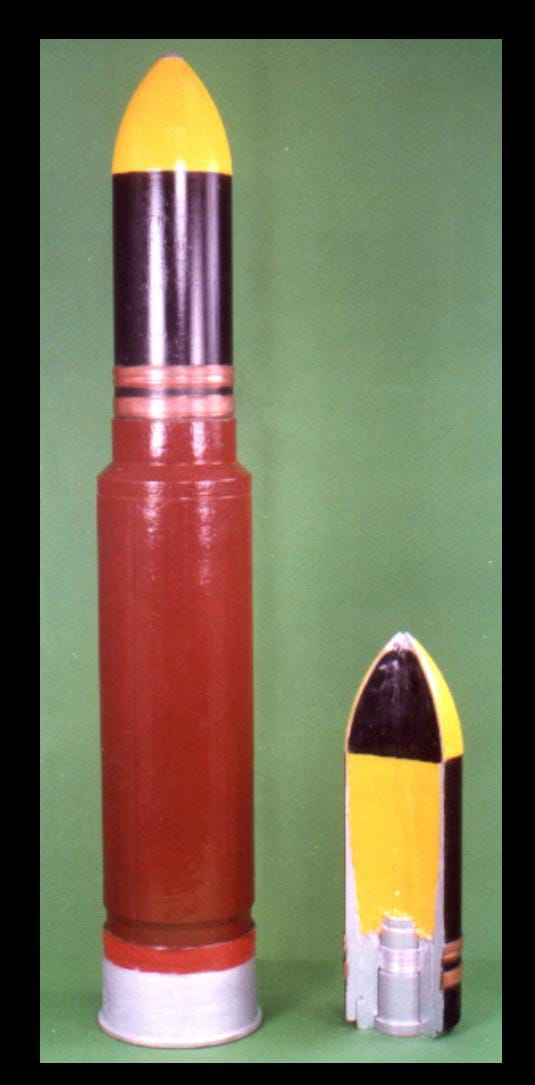
Cross section of a 120 mm HESH round from the Arjun main battle tank

A high-explosive squash head (HESH), in British terminology, or a high-explosive plastic/plasticized (HEP), in American terminology, is a type of high-explosive artillery shell with plastic explosive that conforms to the surface of a target before detonating, which improves the transfer of explosive energy to the target. Squash head projectiles are similar to high-explosive projectiles and are well suited to many of the same targets. However, while HESH projectiles are not armour-piercing, they can defeat armored targets by causing spall, which can injure or kill a vehicle's occupants or detonate some types of ammunition.

== Design ==
External videos
- HESH round working principle animation on YouTube
- HESH round comparison on YouTube

=== Function ===
HESH rounds are thin-walled shells filled with plastic explosive and a delayed-action fuze at the base of the shell. On impact, the inert material, followed by plastic explosive, is 'squashed' against the surface of the target and spreads out to form a disc or 'pat' of explosive. The inert material helps prevent premature detonation of the plastic explosive and sustains the impact pressure and temperature.

Milliseconds later, the base fuze detonates the explosive, creating a shock wave that, owing to its large surface area and direct contact with the target, is transmitted through the material. In the metal armour of a tank, the compression shock wave is conducted through the armour to the point where it reaches the metal-air interface (the hollow crew compartment), where some of the energy is reflected as a tension wave, a phenomenon called impulsive loading. At the point where the compression and tension waves intersect, a high-stress zone is created in the metal, causing pieces of steel to be projected off the interior wall at high velocity.

Shell design: charge, fuze, shell

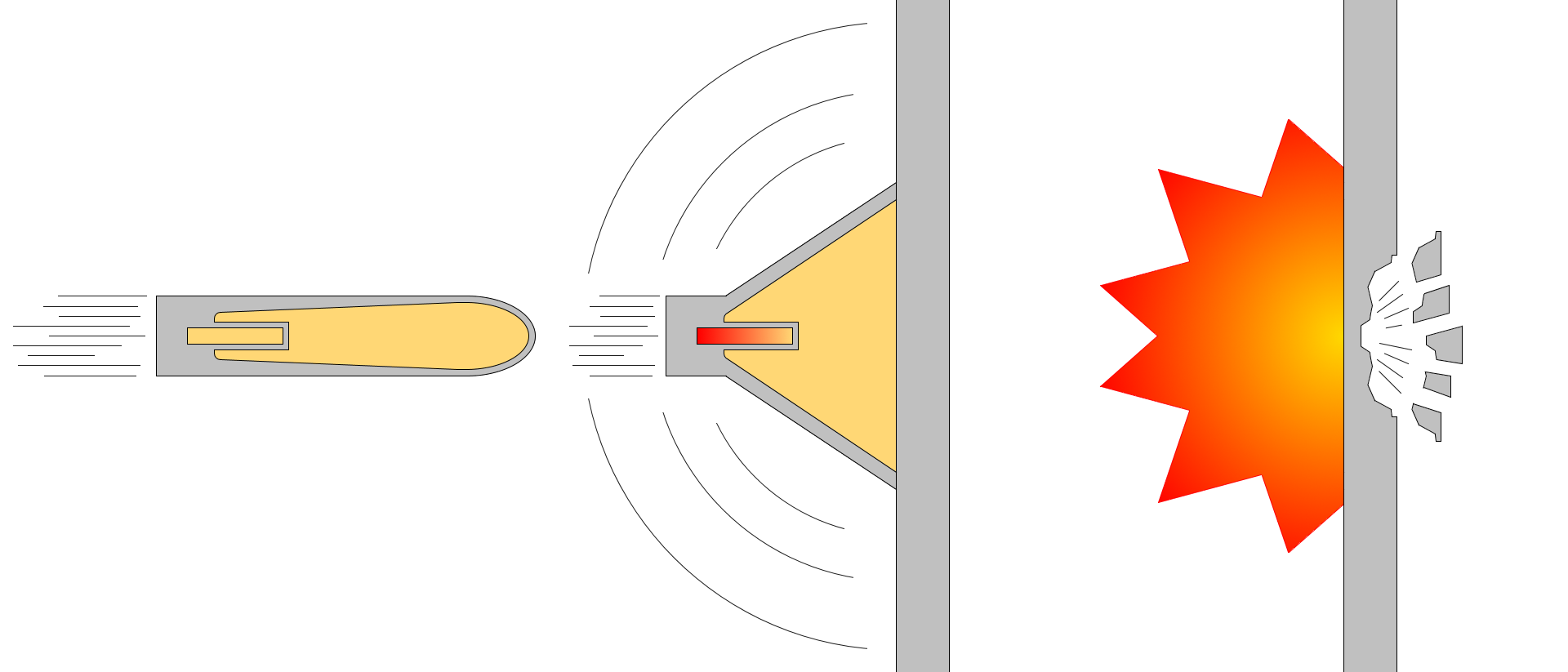
Function of HESH-munition

=== Effect ===
This fragmentation by blast wave is known as 'scabbing' or 'spalling', with the fragments termed 'scabs' or 'spall'.

Depending upon the armour thickness, a heavy piece of target material (4 to 10 kg (9 to 22 lb) for a 120 mm (4.7 in) round used in Arjun MBT) can separate out from the other end of the target with supersonic velocities. This spall is sufficient to permanently damage the essentials of a tank, igniting the ammunition or fuel storage and severely damaging the crew to achieve a "total kill" of the target. In general, the thicker the armour, the higher the scab weight will be.

The fragmentation achieved by impulsive loading of armour block by a HESH round is more lethal than similar high explosive rounds.

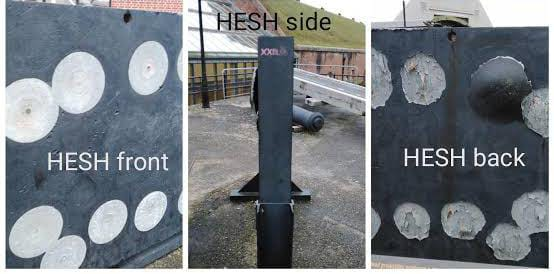
Front and back side of armour block impacted by HESH rounds

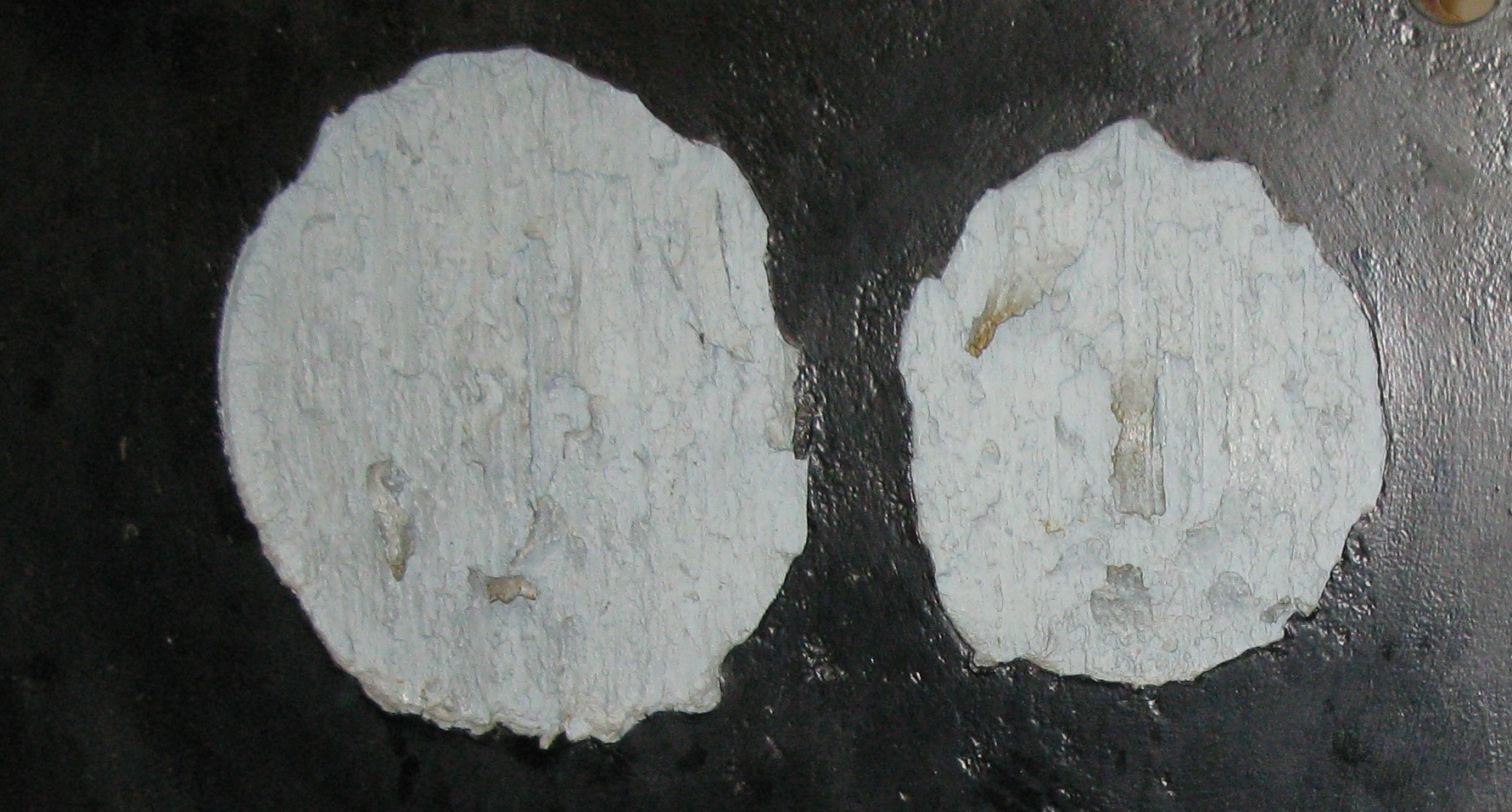
Light spalling damage caused by HESH rounds

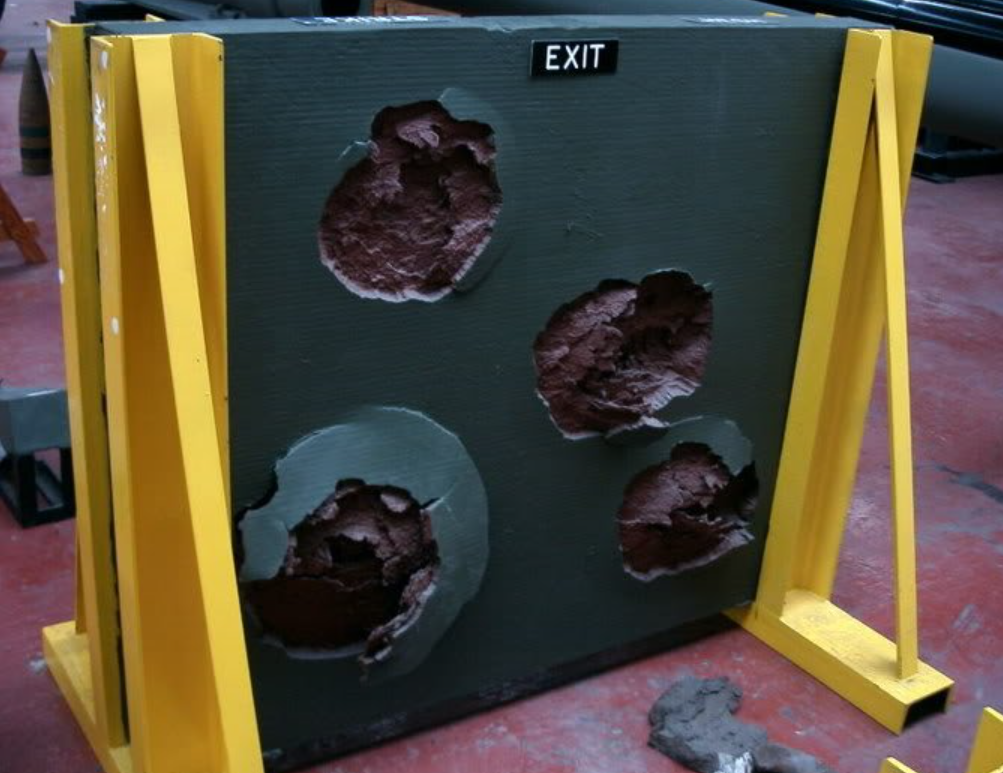
Heavy spalling damage caused by HESH rounds

=== Use ===
HESH rounds are mostly fired from guns with rifled, rather than smoothbore, barrels. Rifling causes a projectile to spin, thereby allowing longer projectiles to be used, while at the same time improving accuracy. This also may make a HESH shell more effective on impact by increasing the surface area of contact for the explosive: the faster the spin, the larger the resultant contact patch. HESH shells are not specifically designed to perforate the armour of vehicles, unlike high-explosive anti-tank (HEAT) rounds, with their shaped charge jets. HESH shells rely instead on transmitting a shock wave through the solid steel armor.

HESH ammunition is effective for general purpose use, being effective against most targets, though the round is generally used at relatively low velocities (generally under 800 m/s (2,600 ft/s)) because a high velocity excessively disperses the pat of explosive. While only effective against tanks without spaced armour or spall liners, the round is still favoured for combat demolition purposes. The flattened high-velocity explosive pat can better destroy concrete constructions than a HEAT round (which is designed to penetrate armour), and without the dangerous fragmentation of a traditional high explosive (HE) fragmentation round.

== History ==
HESH was developed by Dennistoun Burney in the 1940s for the British war effort, originally as an anti-fortification "wallbuster" munition for use against concrete. He also led British developments in recoilless rifles as a means to deliver the shell. An early application of the HESH principle post WWII was the L9 165 mm demolition gun fitted to AVRE combat engineer vehicles.

HESH was found to be surprisingly effective against metallic armour as well as concrete structures. It was widely used as a primary round in most large calibre rifled guns.

== Users ==
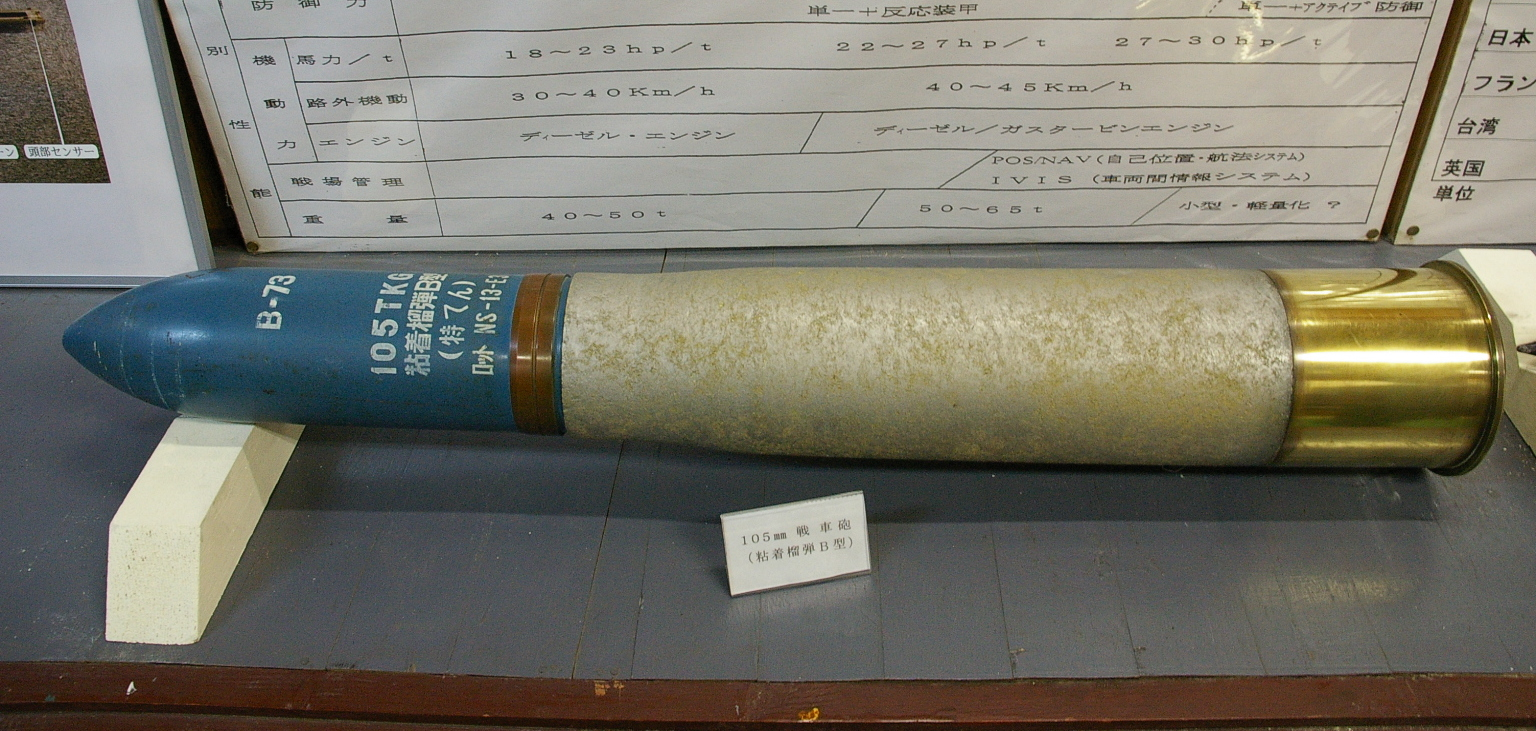
Japanese 105 mm Type B HESH shell for the Royal Ordnance L7 rifled gun in use on the Type 74 tank

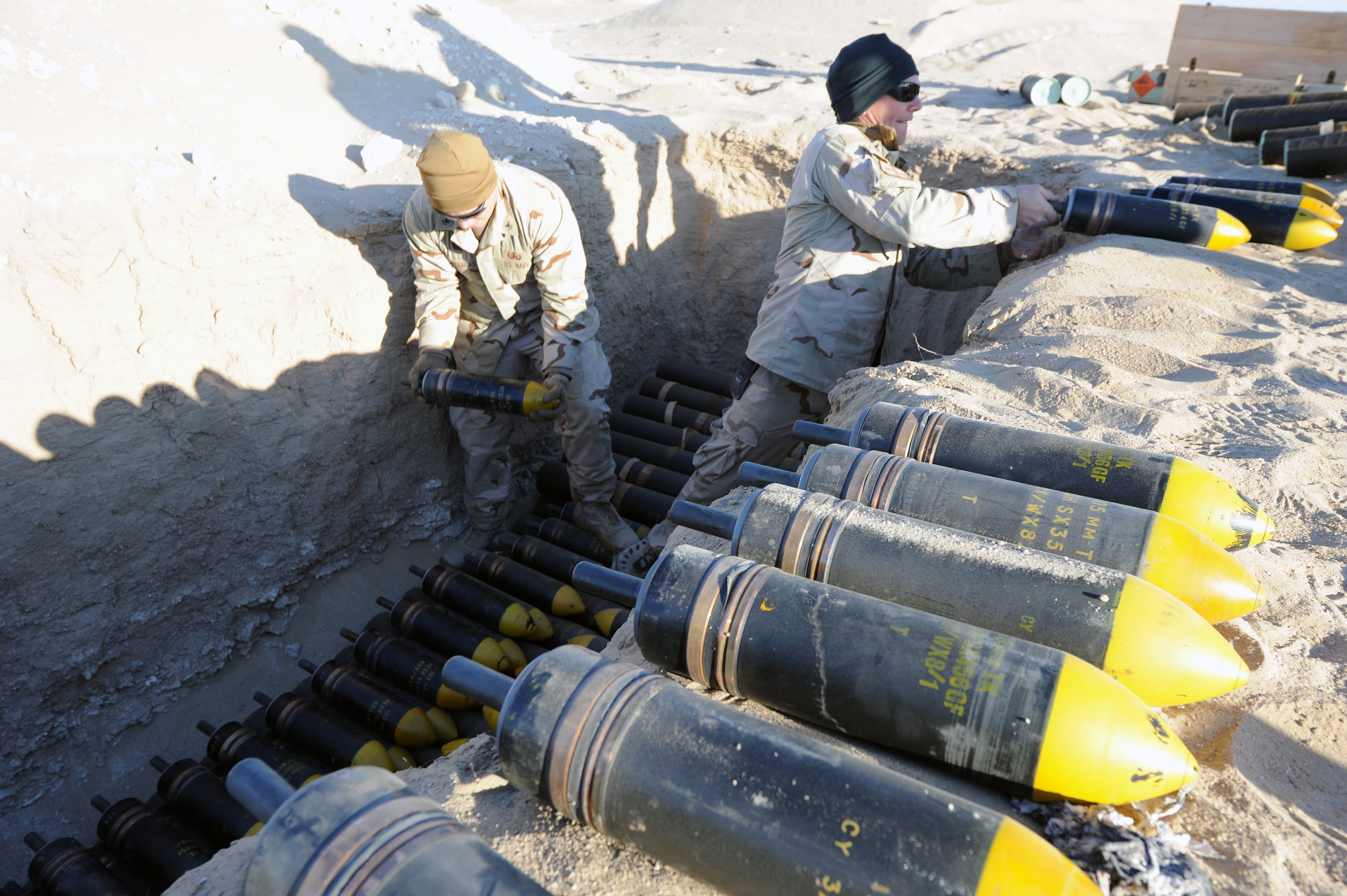
US Navy technicians building a munitions disposal for HESH (HEP) shells

HESH rounds were fielded mainly by the British Army as the main explosive round of its main battle tanks during the Cold War. It was also used by other military forces, especially those that acquired the early post-World War II British 105 mm (4.1 in) Royal Ordnance L7A1 tank gun, including Germany, India, Israel, and Sweden.

Since the 1980s, HESH ammunition has increasingly lost favour as armour designs have trended towards layered composites of hard metal and heat-resistant materials. This type of armour conducts shock waves poorly. Anti-spalling devices (spall liners), made of materials such as Kevlar, are commonly fitted to the interior surface of modern armoured vehicles to minimise spalling effects. Another reason for the declining use of HESH rounds is the preference of most armies using smoothbore guns due to the usage of powerful armour-piercing fin-stabilized discarding sabot, which would significantly decrease the rifled gun's barrel life.

British Challenger 1 and Challenger 2 tanks, and India's Arjun tank (which has the same rifled 120 mm (4.7 in) gun as the UK's MBTs) use HESH rounds as their primary ammunition. Among other ammunition types, the Stryker Mobile Gun System variant is to be equipped with a 105 mm (4.1 in) HESH round for demolition and bunker-busting purposes. Argentina's TAM medium tanks, Canada's Leopard C1 and Leopard C2 main battle tanks (all of which mount the same 105 mm (4.1 in) gun as the Centurion), the Australian Leopard AS1 main battle tank, and the Chinese VT-4 main battle tank (which mounts a 125 mm (4.9 in) smoothbore gun) all use HESH rounds.

HESH rounds are also carried by armoured engineer vehicles; they are typically intended for use against fortifications rather than armoured fighting vehicles. A 165 mm (6.5 in) HESH round is used by the United States Army for the main gun of the M728 combat engineer vehicle, an M60 tank equipped with a bulldozer blade. Similarly, the UK's Centurion AVRE was equipped with a short 165 mm (6.5 in) gun solely for a 29 kg (64 lb) HESH shell.

== See also ==
- Munroe effect
- High-explosive incendiary
- Mine shell
