= Stankomash =

- Company type: Open Joint Stock Company
- Founded: 1935
- Headquarters: Chelyabinsk, Russia
- Website: www.stankomash74.ru

Stankomash (Russian: Станкомаш), previously known as Chelyabinsk Ordzhonikidze Plant, is a company based in Chelyabinsk, Russia and established in 1935.

The Ordzhonikidze Plant has produced artillery shells and parts for armored vehicles for many years. The Production Association makes a wide mix of products including agricultural machinery, machine tools, consumer durables, and products for household use. The company was given its current name in 1994.

It is the main production facility of the KONAR Industrial Group.
