= Royal Ordnance L9 =

British demolition gun

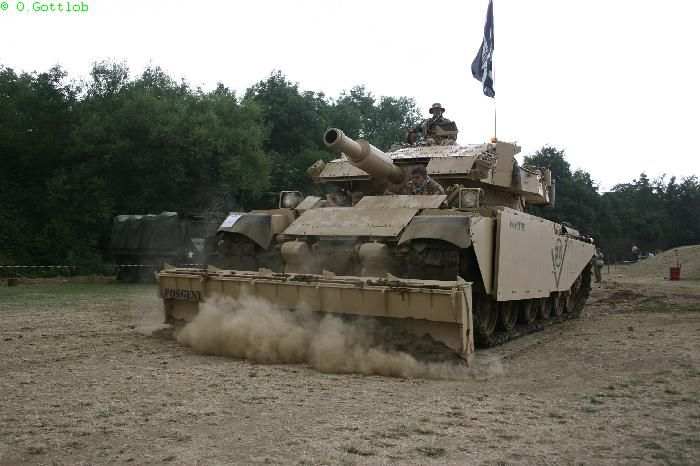
- Centurion AVRE 165
- Place of origin: United Kingdom

Production history
- Manufacturer: Royal Ordnance Factories

Specifications
- Shell weight: 29 kg (64 lb)
- Calibre: 165 mm (6.5 in)

Royal Ordnance 165mm L9 Demolition Gun, initially called Ordnance BL 6.5" Mk I, is a British short-barrelled 165 mm (6.5 in) gun used for combat engineering, particularly the demolition of defences.

The gun is capable of firing a 29 kg (64 lb) High Explosive Squash Head (HESH) demolition projectile distances up to 2,400 m (2,600 yd). The HESH shell contains 18 kg (40 lb) of C-4 explosive.

The L9 gun was mounted on Royal Engineers AVRE versions of the Churchill and Centurion tanks after the Second World War.

The gun's primary purpose is the clearing of obstacles such as walls, fences, roadblocks or bunkers, and the destruction of buildings.

== Variants ==
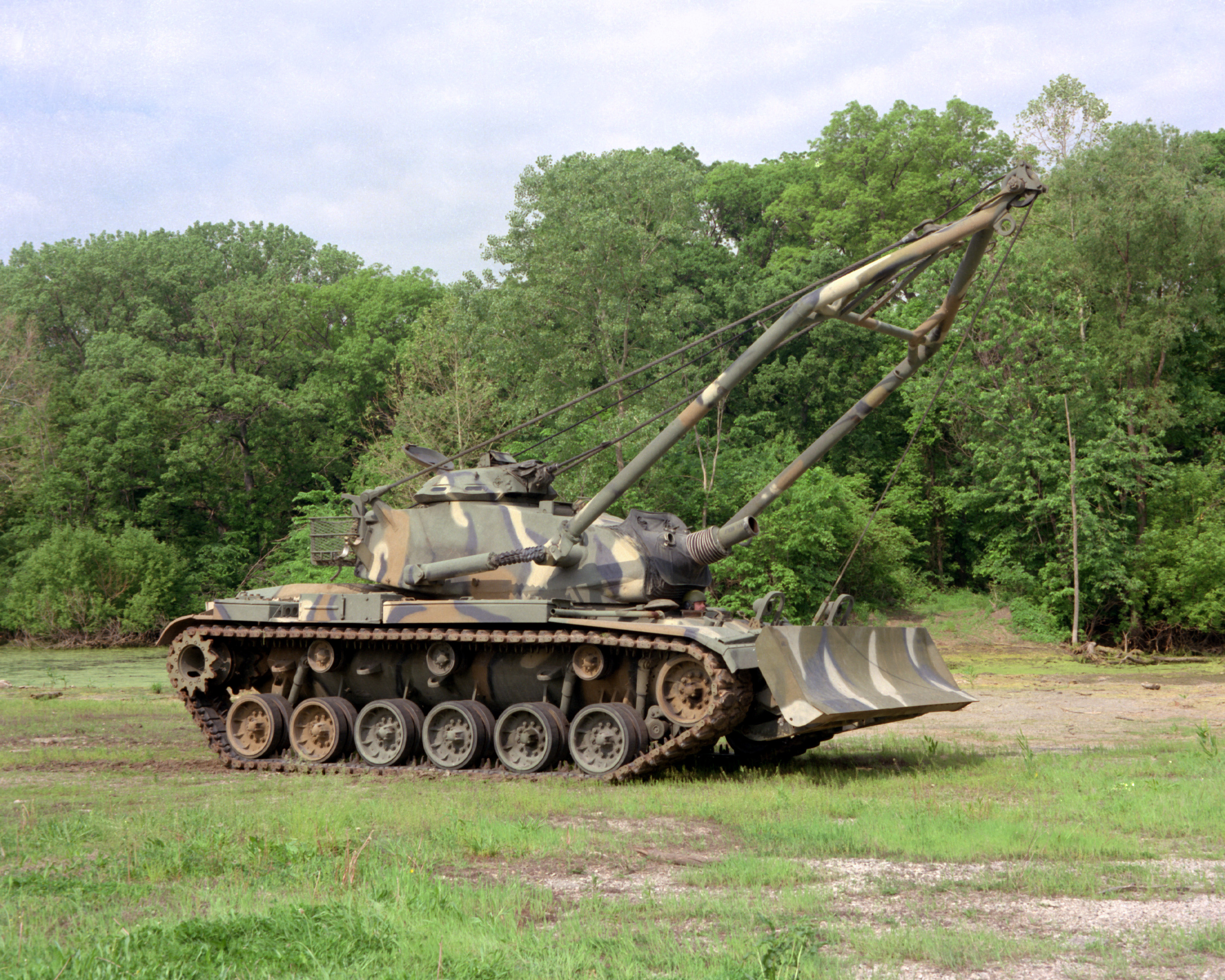
M728 Combat Engineer Vehicle

- L9A1: improved version
- M135: American version, used on M728 Combat Engineer Vehicle, variant of the M60 tank.

== General and cited references ==
- US Army Field Manual FM 5-103 Survivability, Appendix A, Headquarters, Department of the Army, Washington, D.C., 10 June 1985
- Hunnicutt, R. P. Patton: A History of the American Main Battle Tank. 1984; Presidio Press. ISBN 0-89141-230-1.
