= Kangaroo (armoured personnel carrier) =

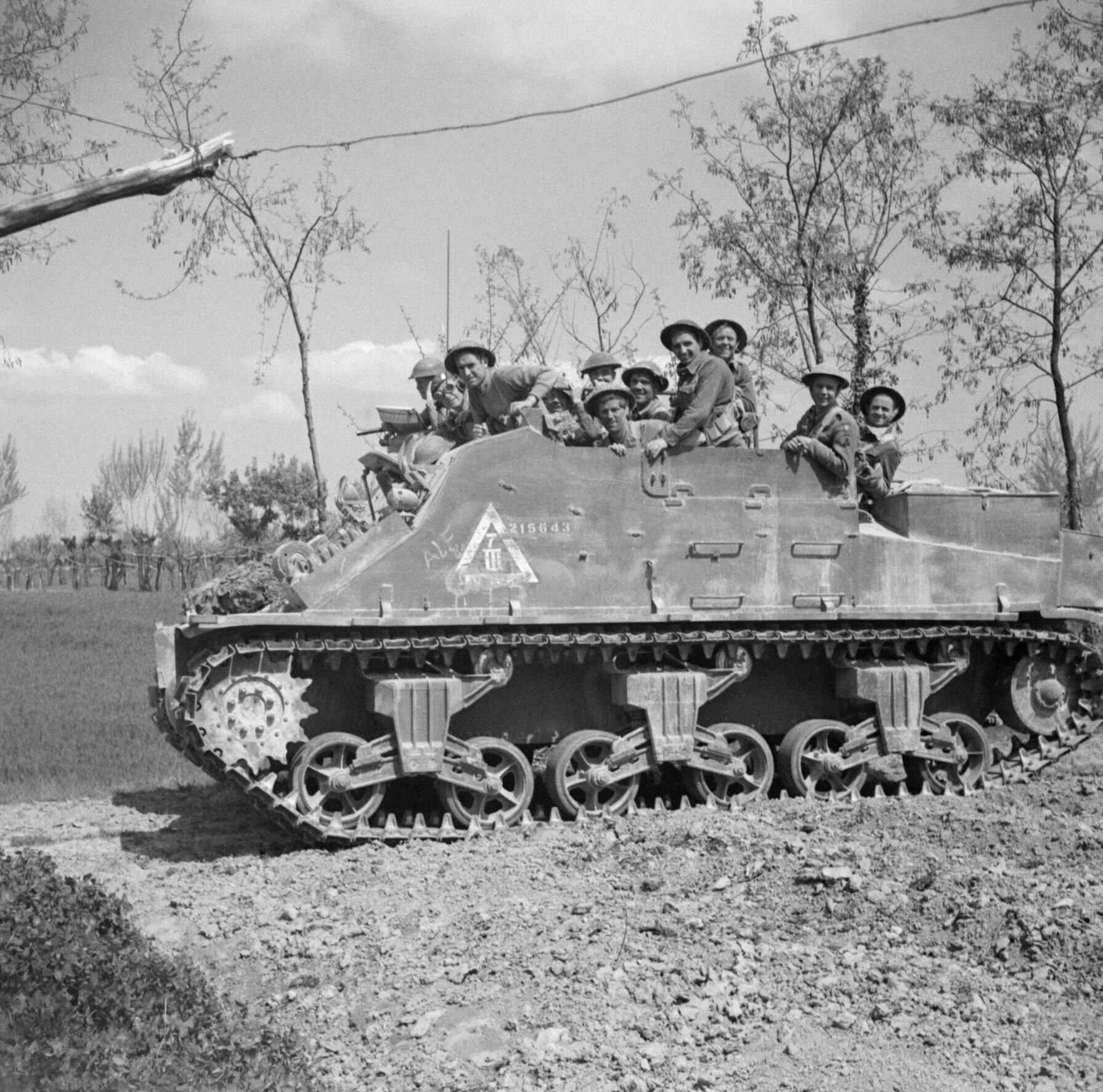
- A Priest Kangaroo of 4th Queen's Own Hussars, 9th Armoured Brigade, transports infantry of 78th Division near Conselice, Italy, 13 April 1945.
- Type: Armoured personnel carrier
- Place of origin: Canada

Service history
- In service: 1943–1945

Production history
- Designer: Guy Simonds
- Designed: 1944
- Variants: Ram Kangaroo; Priest Kangaroo; Churchill Kangaroo; Kangaroo Badger flame tank

Specifications
- Crew: 2 + 8 to 10 passengers, often more
- Main armament: 1 × .50 cal MG (Early models); 1 × .30 cal MG (Later models) (Pintle mount)
- Secondary armament: 1 × .30 cal MG (Bow or cupola MG depending on model); Flamethrower (Kangaroo Badger: Replaced cupola MG)

A Kangaroo was any of a series of Canadian armoured personnel carriers (APC) during the Second World War created by converting a tank chassis. Kangaroos were created as an expedient measure "in the field" by the Canadian Army, and were so successful that they were used by other Commonwealth forces, including the British Army.

Their ability to manoeuvre in the field with tanks was a major advantage over earlier designs, and led to the dedicated APC designs that were introduced by almost all armies immediately after the war.

== History ==
The earliest iterations of the Kangaroo were created from M3 and M5 Stuart light tanks to serve as artillery tractors in North Africa campaign in circumstances where Universal Carriers were unavailable. They were effective in their role, but attempts by soldiers to use them as improvised APCs proved ill-advised due to the Stuart's very light armour.

In July 1944, Lieutenant-General Harry Crerar's First Canadian Army was concerned by manpower shortages due to combat losses. While the British and Canadian forces had received some American M3 Half-track APCs, the supply was heavily reduced by this point due to the Americans' own need for them, and Universal Carriers were individually insufficient despite the enormous numbers. However, self-propelled artillery and tanks were currently oversupplied, with a significant number sitting idle not being used. Lieutenant-General Guy Simonds, commander of II Canadian Corps, devised Kangaroos as a field-expedient alternative to purpose-built APCs.

The original Kangaroos were converted from 72 M7 Priest self-propelled guns of three field artillery regiments of the 3rd Canadian Infantry Division. (Note: 72 had been converted by the night before use, a further four were finished the following day.) The Priests were "defrocked" at the Advanced Workshop Depot under the codename "Kangeroo", removing their 105 mm guns and ammunition stowage, and separating the driver's compartment from the rest of the vehicle. Priests with machine gun turrets retained them, and some that did not already have machine gun mounts had improvised ones fitted. The work was carried out at short notice, the general direction being given on 31 July to be ready by 9 August though official sanction was not given by 21st Army Group until 2 August. An ad hoc depot was set up by Major Wiggan employing the services of British REME and Royal Canadian EME and other Canadian service corps. Extensive supplies of materials including spare engines were provided. Where there was insufficient armour plate, steel was scavenged and a sandwich of metal and sand was used to fill in the gap in the front of the hull where the gun had been.

When the 3rd Canadian Infantry Division was re-equipped with towed Ordnance QF 25-pounder gun-howitzers in late July, the rest of their self-propelled tracked vehicles were stripped of their 105 mm guns and converted to Kangaroos. Later Kangaroos were based on Sherman, Churchill, and obsolete Canadian Ram tanks. The process was broadly similar, with the entire turret removed, ammunition storage removed, bench seats fitted in the turret ring area, and the driver's compartment separated. Hull machine guns were retained, and new machine guns were sometimes fitted to the turret ring. Kangaroos in general were supposed to carry 8 to 12 soldiers, though similar to the practice of troops riding on tanks, it was more common to simply cram as many as could fit without being at risk of falling off.

The Priest Kangaroos were first used on 8 August 1944 south of Caen during Operation Totalize to supplement the half-tracks already available. When re-converted Kangaroos were returned to U.S. custody, other vehicles were pressed into service, the vast majority (some 500) being Rams, which were standing idle after being used as training vehicles when Canadian armoured formations re-equipped with Shermans. The Ram gun tanks were shipped to France and duly converted, deploying piecemeal as they arrived.

While 'debussing' - climbing out of the hull and jumping down, potentially under fire - was challenging, the obvious difficulty of getting into a vehicle that was designed to prevent enemy soldiers climbing onto it was quickly appreciated. Accordingly, climbing rungs were soon added as a field modification that also simplified loading the carrying compartment with ammunition, food and other supplies to troops under fire.

The Ram Kangaroo entered service piecemeal with the Canadians in September 1944, but in December these minor units were combined to form the 1st Canadian Armoured Carrier Regiment (initially the 1st Canadian Armoured Personnel Carrier Regiment), joining the British 49th Armoured Carrier Regiment under the British 79th Armoured Division which was the administrative division for the deployment of the specialized combat support vehicles known as "Hobart's Funnies".

The first operation for the Ram Kangaroo was Operation Astonia, the assault on Le Havre 10-12 September 1944, the last the British 7th Armoured Division's march into Hamburg on 3 May 1945 in the Capture of Hamburg.

In Italy, Sherman III tanks and some Priests were converted for use by the British Eighth Army. Removing the turret of the Sherman and some internal fittings gave room for carrying up to ten troops.

From 1943, Stuart tanks (both M3 and M5) had their turrets removed and seating fitted to carry infantry troops attached to British armoured brigades.

== Gallery ==
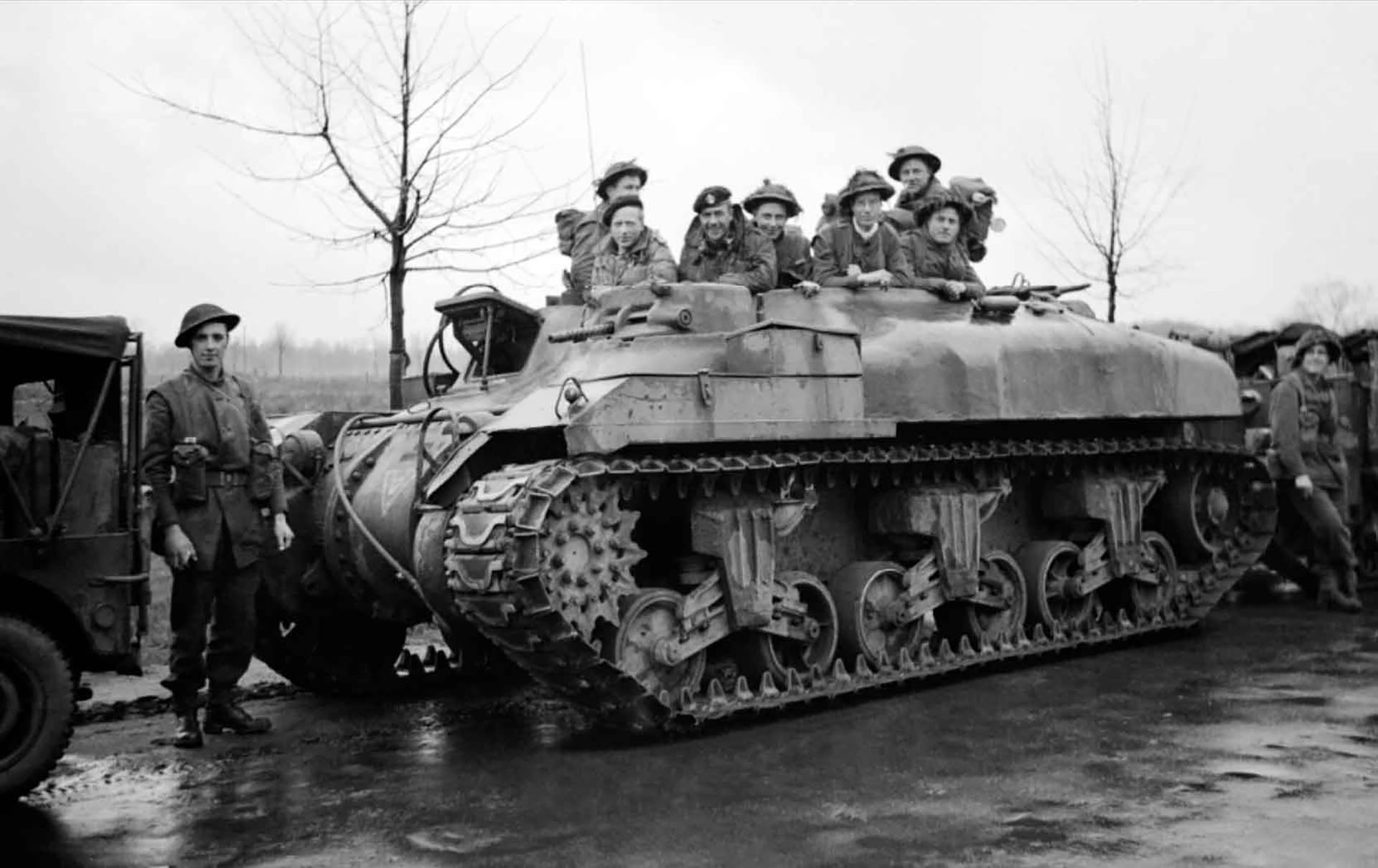
Infantry of the 53rd (Welsh) Division in a Ram Kangaroo of the 49th Armoured Personnel Carrier Regiment, on the outskirts of Ochtrup, Germany, 3 April 1945

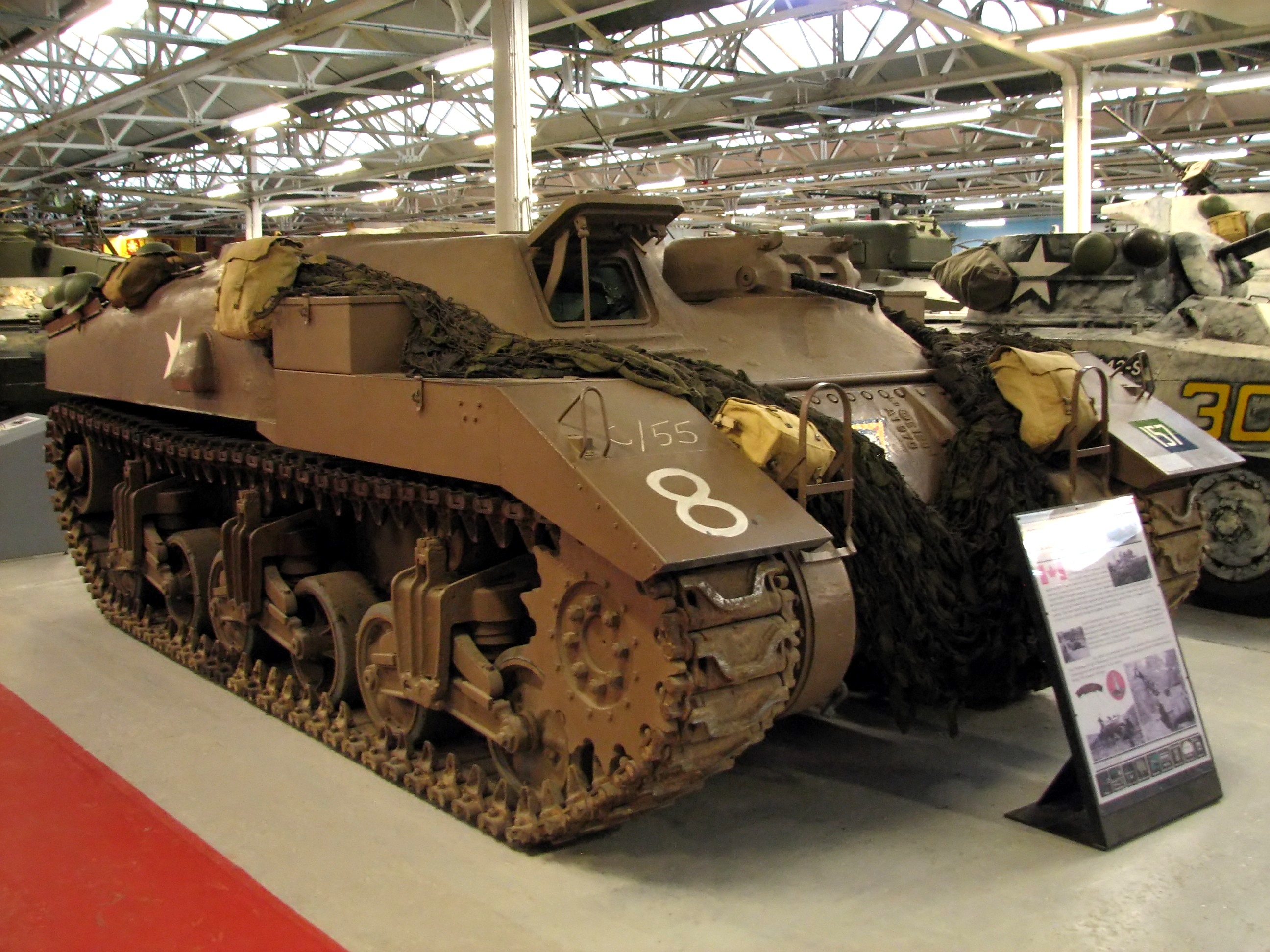
Ram Kangaroo at The Tank Museum, Bovington

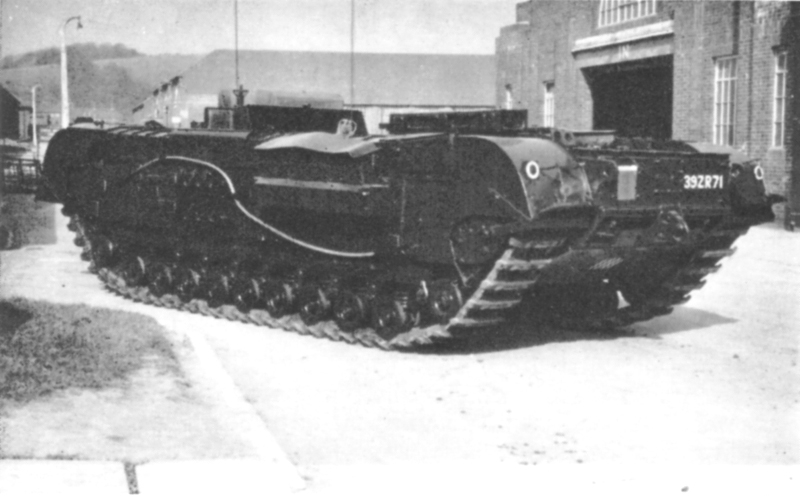
A Churchill Kangaroo viewed from the rear corner

== See also ==
- Lorraine 37L
- Churchill tank
- Sherman tank
- Operation Totalize

Israeli conversions

- BTR-T and IDF Achzarit, less haphazard conversions of T-55s into APCs.
- Namer - based on Merkava tank
- Nagmachon and Nakpadon - both based on Centurion tank
