= Sho't =

Israeli variant of the Centurion Tank

Shot
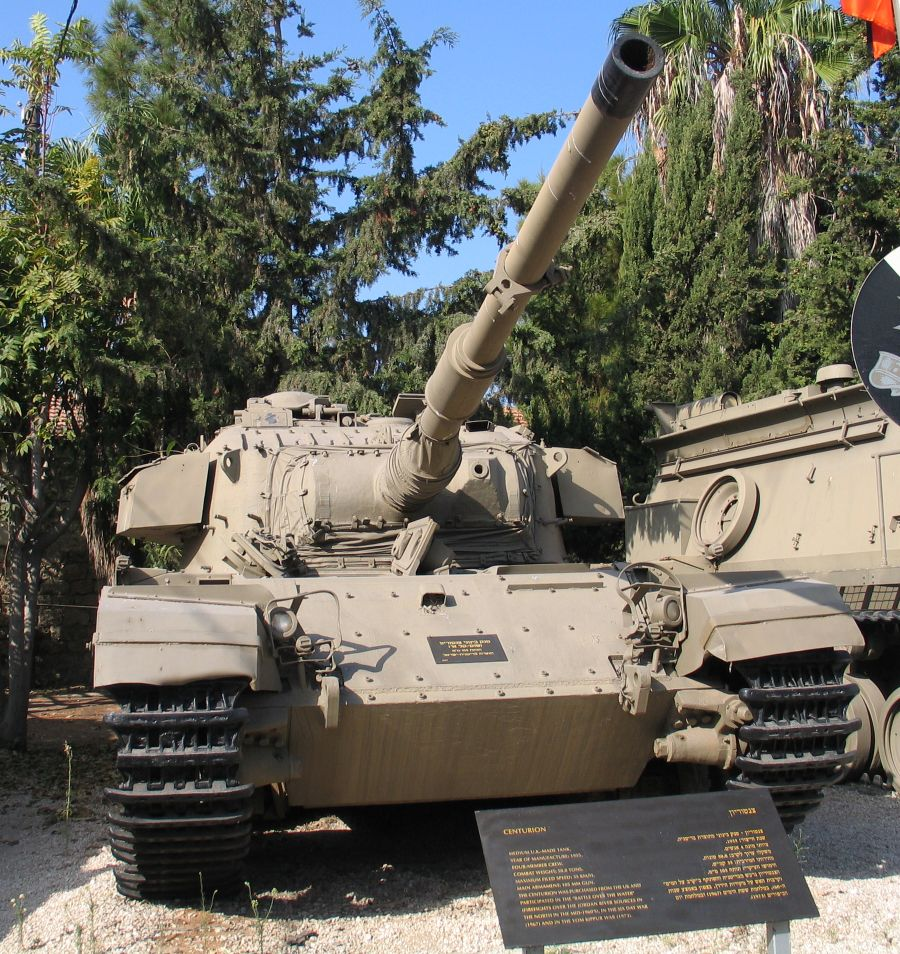
- Shot Kal in Batey ha-Osef museum in Tel Aviv, Israel, in 2005
- Type: Main battle tank
- Place of origin: United Kingdom

Service history
- In service: 1959–1991 (active duty); 1991–2002 (reserves)
- Used by: Israel
- Wars: Six-Day War; War of Attrition; Yom Kippur War; 1978 South Lebanon conflict; 1982 Lebanon War; South Lebanon conflict (1985-2000)

Specifications
- Crew: 4 (commander, gunner, loader, driver)
- Main armament: Ordnance QF 20-pounder (20-pounder Shots) Royal Ordnance L7 105mm rifled gun (Shot Meteor and after)
- Secondary armament: Meteor: pintle-mounted .50 caliber M2HB machine gun attached to commander's cupola; Meteor/Alef/Bet/Gimel: coaxial .30 caliber M1919A4 machine gun; Alef/Bet/Gimel/Dalet: fixed-mounted .50 caliber M2HB machine gun above main gun mantlet (at times absent in place of nothing, searchlight, etc); Alef/Bet/Gimel: pintle-mounted .30 caliber M1919A4 machine gun attached to commander's cupola; Bet/Gimel: pintle-mounted .30 caliber M1919A4 machine guns mounted close to loader's hatch; Dalet: coaxial .30 caliber FN MAG 60-40; Dalet: pintle-mounted .30 caliber FN MAG 60-40 attached to commander's cupola; Dalet: pintle-mounted .30 caliber FN MAG 60-40 mounted close to loader's hatch
- Engine: Shot Meteor: Rolls-Royce Meteor; Alef/Bet: Continental AVDS1790-2AC; Gimel/Dalet: Continental AVDS1790-2AG
- Transmission: Shot Meteor: Merrit-Brown Z51R; Alef/Bet/Gimel/Dalet: Allison CD-850-6A
- Suspension: Modified Horstmann

Shot (Hebrew: שוט, lit. 'whip') is the Israeli designation of the British Centurion tank in IDF service from 1959 to 2002.

== Versions ==
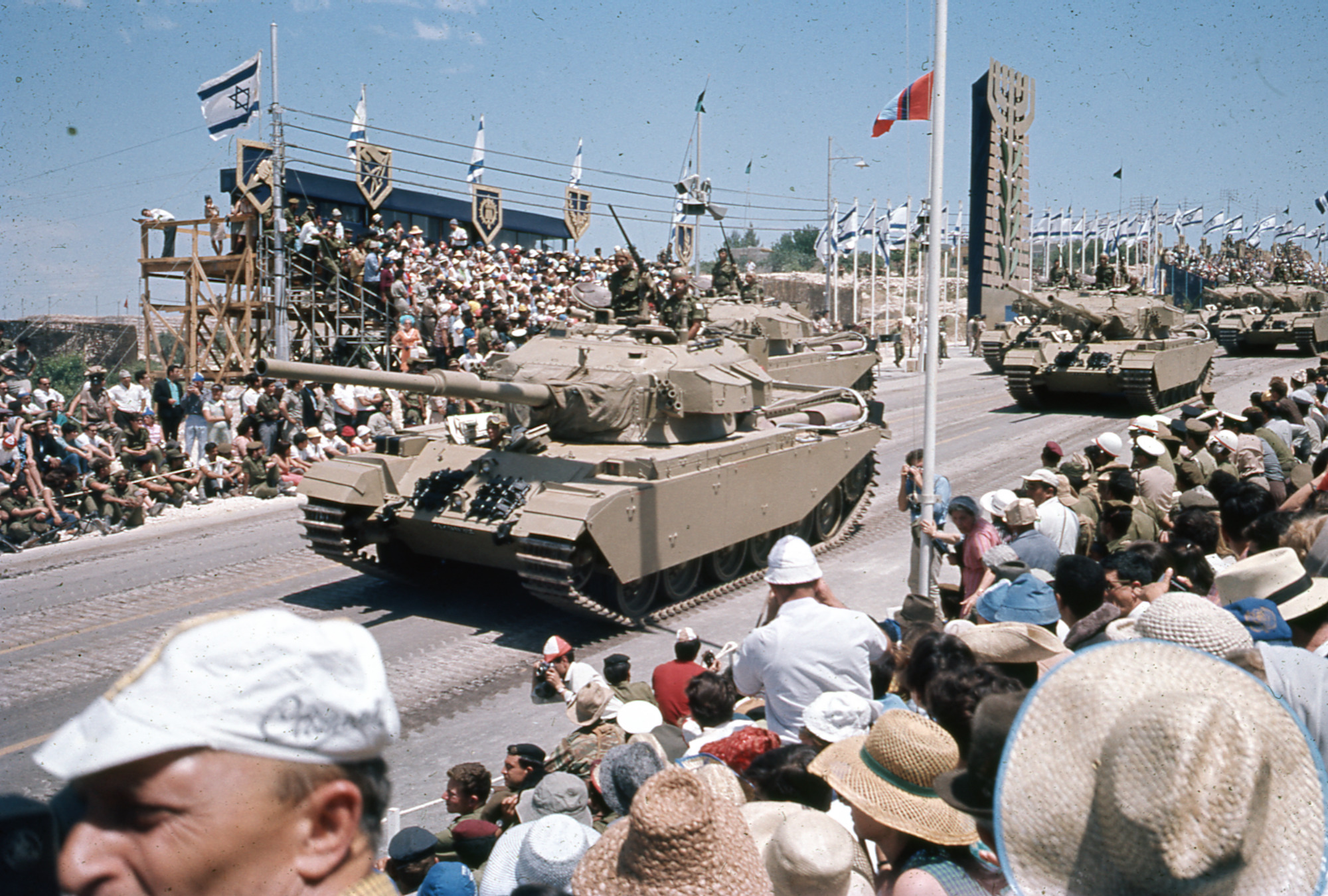
Multiple Shot Meteors pictured moving past during a military parade in Jerusalem, 1968.

=== Shot Meteor ===
Shot Meteors are made up of Mark 3, Mark 5, and Mark 8 Centurion tanks with the original Rolls-Royce Meteor engine upgunned to the 105mm Royal Ordnance L7 cannon. These tanks received minor additional upgrades and modifications by the Israel Defense Forces in earlier improvement programs for the tank. Bearing many original similarities to the British Centurions, they were not as heavily modified as the later Shot Kal would be. Two main significant modifications were installed during Israeli Centurions' service that would make the Shot Meteor: the replacement of the 84mm 20-pounder cannon with the 105mm L7 cannon, and the addition of an exterior rear fuel tank which greatly improved the range of the Shot. The Shot Meteor would be distinct for these two main modifications. Shot Meteors only started to be referred to as Meteors when the Shot Kal was introduced in order to differentiate the tanks. Before that, the normal name, "Shot" would simply apply to the tanks. "Shot" is still used as a standard common nickname when referring to any type of Shot variant. The Shot Meteor was not limited to, but was used extensively in the Six-Day War, and as well saw partial combat in the Yom Kippur War.

=== Shot Kal series ===
The Shot Kal variants consist of modernized Centurion Mark, 3, 5, and 8 tanks with all the variants including significant mechanical upgrades, such as the new engines (Continental AVDS1790-2AC and 2AG diesel engines), and a new Allison CD-850-6 transmission. The addition "Kal" refers to the abbreviation of the engine manufacturer Continental, originally notated in Hebrew as "שוטקל" and transliterated as "shotqal". Kal in Hebrew as well means, "easy", since the modifications of the Shot Kals made day-to-day life easier for the crew members serving in them. The names for the four main Shot Kal variants are derivative from the Hebrew alphabet, with the four variants being the first four letters of the alphabet: Alef, Bet, Gimel, and Dalet. All the Shot Kal variants are an upgrade and advancement of the previous version before them; keeping all previous components, with the only exception of them being replaced, or removed for a specific reason.

The Shot Kal entered service in 1970 with Alef, and by 1974 all Israeli Centurions and Shot Meteors were upgraded to Shot Kal standard. Subvariants indicate upgrades received by Shot Kal tanks during their operational life, including a new turret rotating mechanism, a new gun stabilization system, a new fire-control system, preparations for the installation of the Blazer (Baltan) reactive armor, and more.

=== Shot Kal Alef ===
Being the first version of the Shot Kal series introduced in 1969, the tank only started to be referred as the Alef when the Shot Kal Bet was introduced in 1975, with the Shot Kal series annexing more variants. The Alef was a major upgrade from the Shot Meteor, which was factored mostly by the new Continental AVDS1790-2AC engine and Allison CD-850-6A transmission.

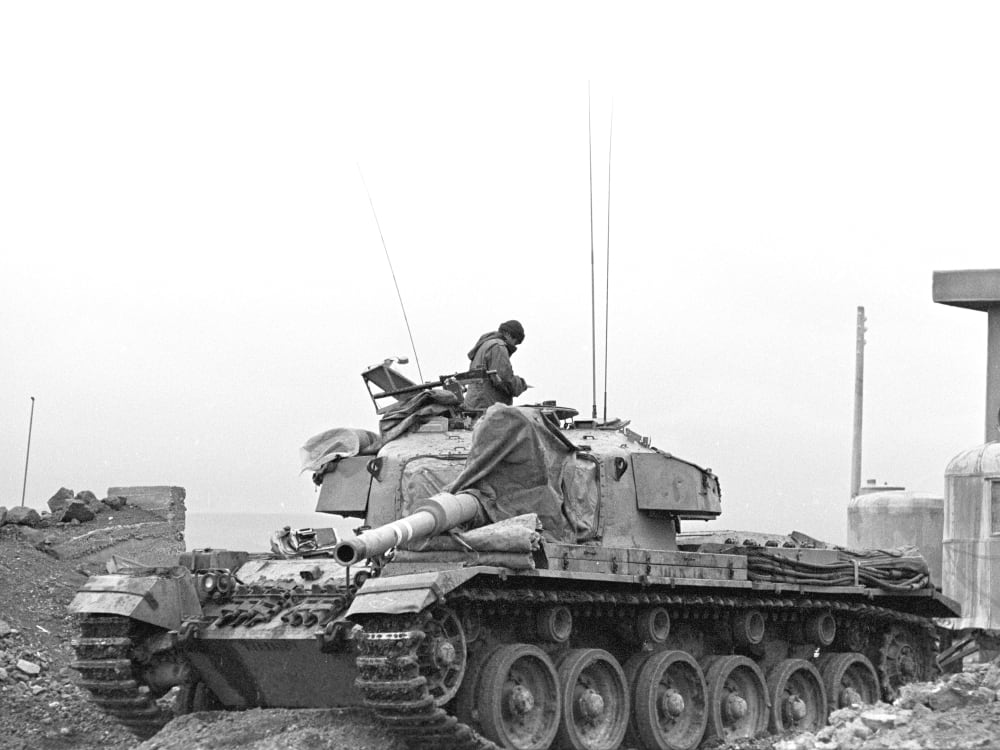
Battalion commander Kahalani's Shot Kal Alef of the 7th Armored Brigade in the Golan Heights during the Yom Kippur War at Nafach Base after the first cease fire announcement. This tank has its side skirt plates not yet put back on, and has received a new xenon searchlight, covered by a canvas to protect it from heavy rain. An additional armor plate is seen attached to the frontal glacis, visible due to the indented slope on the driver's side, and along with a change of armor thickness around the tank's front-right tow hook.

The Shot Kal Alef was used reputably in the 1973 Yom Kippur War along with Israeli Magachs and Shot Meteors. Alefs were commonly equipped above the main gun mantlet with a captured Soviet Luna L-2 infrared searchlight taken from enemy tanks or a fixed-mounted .50 caliber M2HB machine gun; Alefs could also be equipped with a regular western searchlight. The .50 caliber machine gun on the previous Meteor variants were removed from the mount attached to the commander's cupola in favor of a .30 caliber machine gun, this was decided to more effectively deal with anti-tank and infantry teams. An additional 44mm thick frontal glacis armor plate was common to older Centurion Mark 3's upgraded to Shot Kal standard, however, not all Alefs (especially Mk.5's) were equipped with this plate, as some can be seen in photos without the additional glacis plate. The additional plate mainly originates from Britain's Centurion Mark 5/1, which was an upgrade kit for Mark 5's that included the addition of the 44mm plate—these upgraded Mark 5's were mainly seen used by Australia during the Vietnam War but did see service with other countries. The armor was originally innovated to ensure protection against Soviet 100mm cannons.

The smoke grenade launchers from the base Centurion tanks were removed with the transition to the Alef, which would later prove to be an unfortunate mistake. Smoke launcher mounts were still attached to the turrets of some tanks, for not all of the mounts on the tanks had been entirely removed. It was decided smoke was no longer needed to mask tanks in battle; this was greatly regretted in the Yom Kippur War as there were many opportunities in combat where smoke could have been used to mask against ATGMs. Shot Kals were later equipped with modern smoke grenade dischargers in future variants.

=== Shot Kal Bet ===
Introduced in 1975, the Shot Kal Bet was the second variant of the Shot Kal series and saw extensive usage in Operation Litani which occurred in 1978. The Shot Kal Bet was a temporary solution to mechanical issues caused by the old British electric turret control system. Because the original mechanism gave unfavorable limited performance and tired the tank's batteries, it was replaced with a new hydro-electric turret traverse mechanism based on the Cadillac Gage mechanism in the M48 Patton tank. The new traverse system had been proven reliable and eased logistics however worries such as the flammability of the hydraulic fluids creating a risk in combat and the new lack of a gun stabilization system prevented the Bet from being fully implemented in the IDF.

The era of the Shot Kal Bet introduced and standardized the presence of the loader's .30 caliber Browning machine gun to increase effectiveness against anti-infantry teams which was mounted closely to the loader's hatch. The Shot Kal Bet, being implemented around the introduction of Explosive Reactive Armor in the IDF after the costly Yom Kippur War would mostly only be seen equipped with ERA mounting point preparations/bracket slots without the actual reactive armor for security reasons; due to reactive armor's classified nature in the IDF, it was only introduced with publicity in full force with the 1982 Lebanon War, which by then Gimel was in service. Bets could have been equipped with Blazer ERA (referred as Baltan in the IDF) Explosive Reactive Armor in the absolute same capacity the later Gimel could; reactive armor equipped on Shots during peace prior 1982 was a rarity, with a limited example having the tanks being fitted in drills. Bets during Operation Litani (1978) were visibly equipped with ERA mounting points however it would seem the IDF chose not to authorize usage of ERA. Towards the latter part of the tank's service, some Bets had received a thermal sleeve for the 105mm L7 cannon.

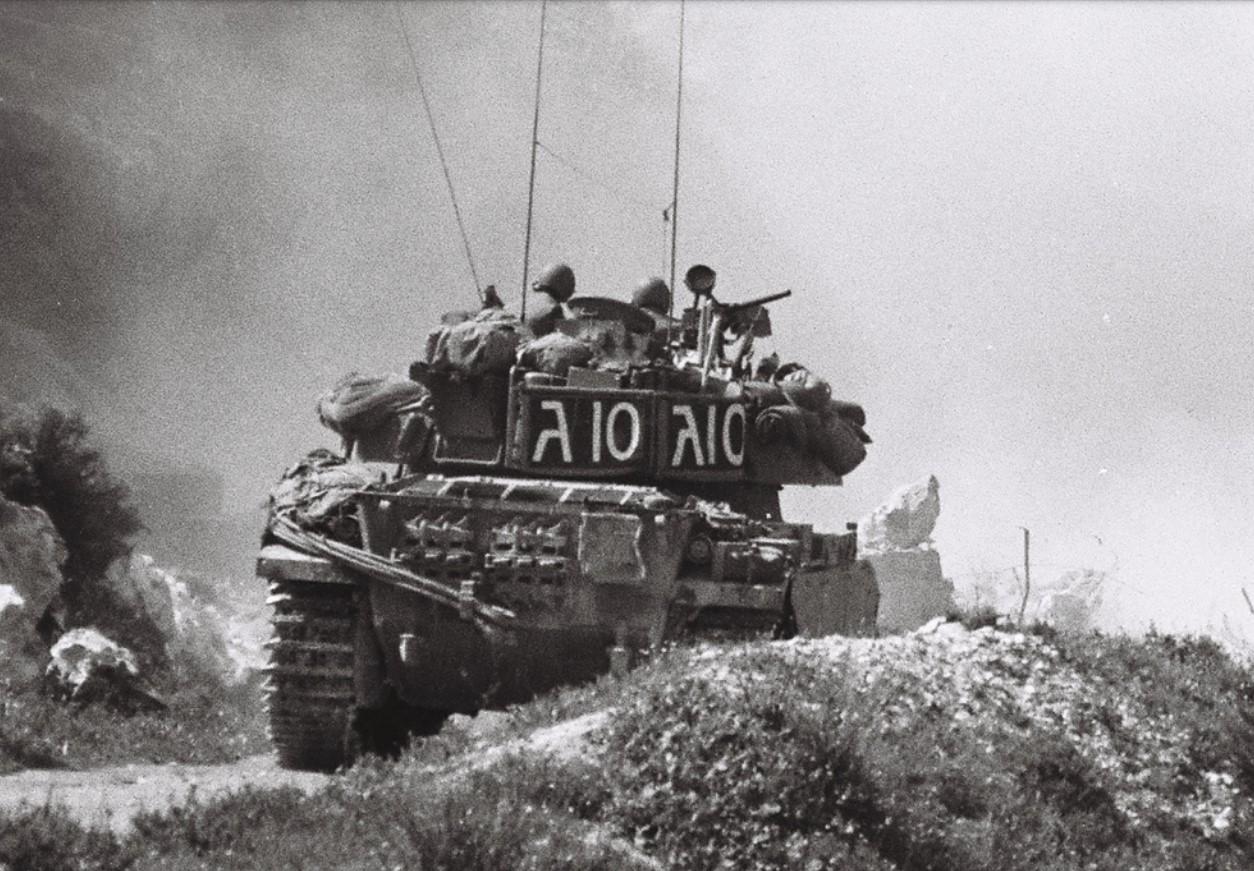
The rear of a Shot Kal tank during Operation Litani. The raised engine deck is visible, to accommodate the bigger American Continental engine. Minor Shot Kal additions are visible, such as the infantry telephone box, spare track links, and stowage baskets on the rear of the turret.

=== Shot Kal Gimel ===
The Shot Kal Gimel was manufactured in 1979 and used in service by the early 1980s, being equipped with Blazer (Baltan) Explosive Reactive Armor and two IS-10 smoke grenade launchers on each side of the turret front. The Shot Kal Gimel received an improved version of the Cadillac Gage-based turret traverse mechanism previously installed in the Bet. Alongside the new turret traverse mechanism, the Gimel obtained a new modern stabilizer, easing the process of the main gun staying on target while engaging—ensuring solid stability for aiming the cannon while traveling at high speeds on rough terrain, and giving high accuracy on the move without needing to stop the tank. The entrance of newer American M60A1 tanks with modern technology had made more upgrades available to Shot Kal tanks. A cheap and simple new fire-control system called Nir David was installed with a portable DVS-5 laser rangefinder. Due to original IDF Ordnance Corps plans being too expensive, Nir David was created as a more cost-effective FCS.

The Gimel featured an upgraded engine, the Continental AVDS1790-2AG; the old 350-amp dynamo electric generator was replaced with an oil-cooled 650-amp alternator, being the cause of the engine model name change from 2AC to 2AG, G standing for generator. Two additional exhausts were added to the engine deck, which is a notable external difference between Shot Kal variants—allowing for ease to determine if a certain variant is the Gimel or beyond. A system was added which allowed for the tank to emit smoke from the newly added exhausts, this would allow for a smoke screen to be created for the purpose of masking against ATGMs, masking and hiding allies, and withdrawing out of a combat area.

Protection against HEAT projectiles was greatly increased due to the installation of Blazer (Baltan) explosive reactive armor. ERA was placed numerously around the tank in order to provide immediate protection against infantry; urban warfare lessons learned from the 1973 Yom Kippur War greatly increased an emphasis on protection from infantry weapons. Orthodox placement of Blazer consisted of being on the frontal glacis plate, hull roof, turret mantlet, frontal turret roof, turret sides, and upper hull sides on the trackguards. Reactive armor was not seen mounted on the side skirts or rear of the tank. The loader's machine gun from the Bet as well transitioned into the Gimel. The tank was able to test its combat effectiveness in Operation Peace for Galilee, more famously known as the 1982 Lebanon War.

=== Shot Kal Dalet ===
The Shot Kal Dalet started production in 1984, being the last production variant of the Shot Kals. The 105mm L7 cannon received a thermal sleeve. The previous .30 caliber M1919A4 machine guns were replaced by Belgian-made FN MAG 60-40's. A new, more advanced fire-control system was added to the Dalet; named "Nachal Oz," this FCS featured thermal imaging. All else from the Gimel was transitioned with the Dalet, such as the ERA and IS-10 smoke launchers. The ERA layout and placement of the bricks was the same as the Gimel. Battering rams started to become a much more common addition with the Dalet, they were attached to the top of frontal lower glacis plate, sporting a spare road wheel facing upwards at the end of the battering ram.

=== Shot Kal Hey ===
The Shot Kal Hey was an attempt to install the Gal fire-control system into the Shot Kal Dalet. It was a prototype that never entered service.

== Combat history ==
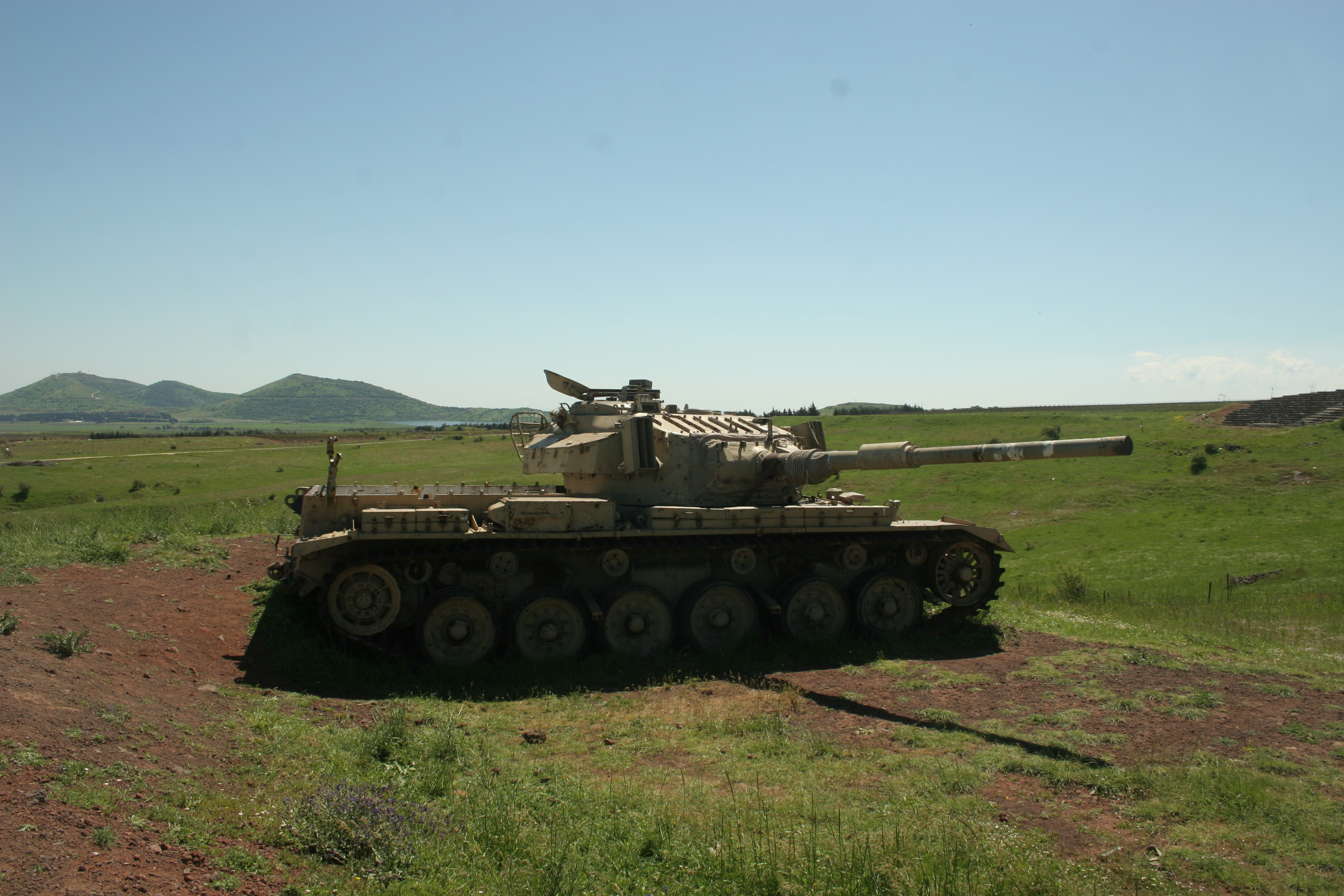
A Shot tank at the Oz 77 memorial, near the Valley of Tears, Golan Heights

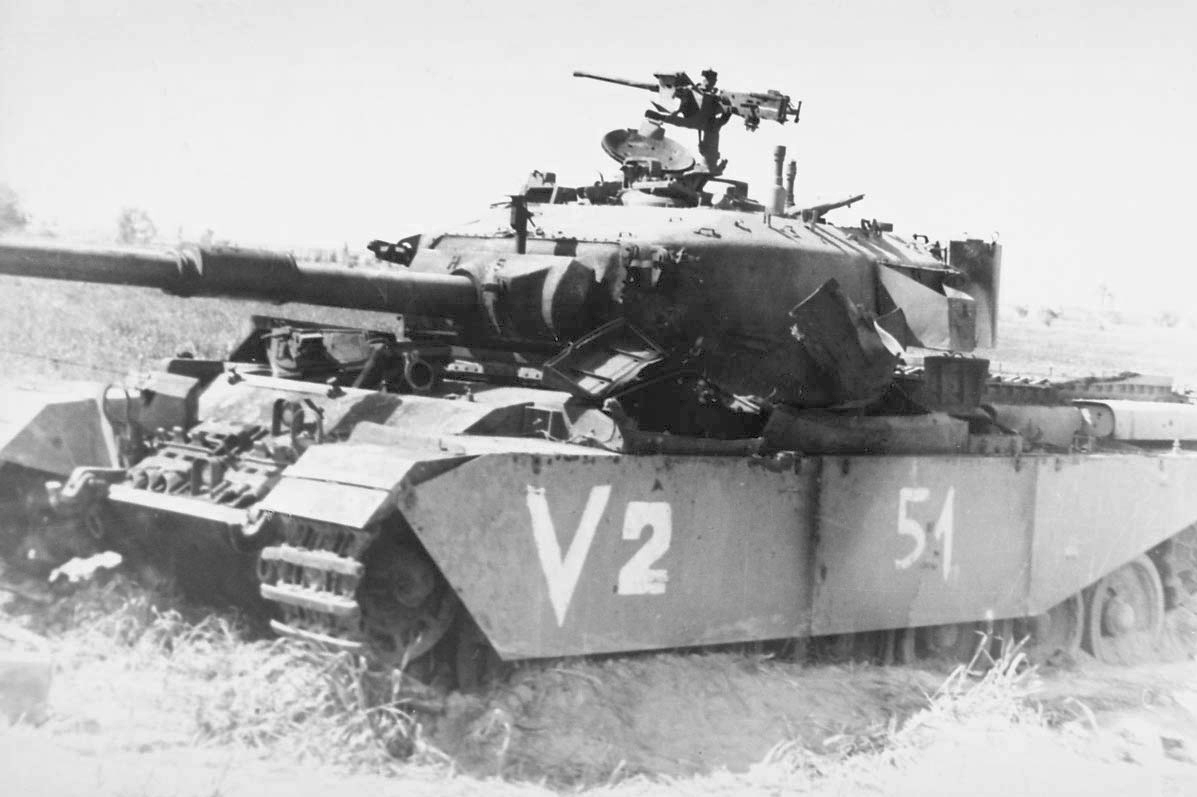
Destroyed Israeli Shot Meteor

The Shot tank served in the Six-Day War in 1967 and the Yom Kippur War in 1973; one of them (Shot Kal Alef), belonging to the 188th Armored Brigade, was operated by Captain Zvika Greengold, an Israeli tank ace. However, as all tanks in the opening days of the 1973 Yom Kippur War, it proved exceedingly vulnerable to Soviet-made weapons such as the RPG-2, RPG-7, and briefcase AT-3 Sagger guided missile, weapons which the Egyptians used in large numbers in the crossing of the Bar Lev Line. It is estimated that the Israeli armed forces lost up to 40% of their southern armored groups during the first two days of the war, highlighting the necessity for infantry support to armored groups, culminating in the Merkava main battle tanks being equipped with rear troop bays.

During the Yom Kippur War, many Alefs frequently had their side skirt plates removed due to the winter creating a high quantity of heavy mud in the Golan Heights, making the mud pack to the suspension and causing mechanical issues. Along with mechanical issues, another big downside was that without the plates the overall protection of the tank was decreased, with RPGs and AT-3 Sagger guided missiles being present and actively used in the war by the enemy. Many tank crews were ordered by battalion commanders to find their plates when the first cease fire was declared, some crews could not find their side skirt plates due to them being left at numerous places when they removed them. After the Yom Kippur War, Shots still had to take off their side skirt plates in future combat roles whenever faced with unfavorable terrain conditions; with no solution being made until the transition to the new Merkava tank, featuring a special type of vertical helical spring suspension that differed from the Centurion's modified Horstmann suspension.

The Shot was also used in the 1978 and 1982 invasions of Lebanon.

== Operators ==
- Israel

== See also ==
- NagmaShot / Nagmachon / Nakpadon – Israeli heavy armoured personnel carriers based on Centurion tank's chassis.
- Puma armored engineering vehicle – Israeli combat engineering vehicle on Centurion tank chassis.
- Centurion tank – British tank from which the Shot is derived.
- Olifant tank – Heavily modified Centurion used by South Africa as the country's main battle tank.
