= Dawsar =

Jordanian heavy armored personnel carrier

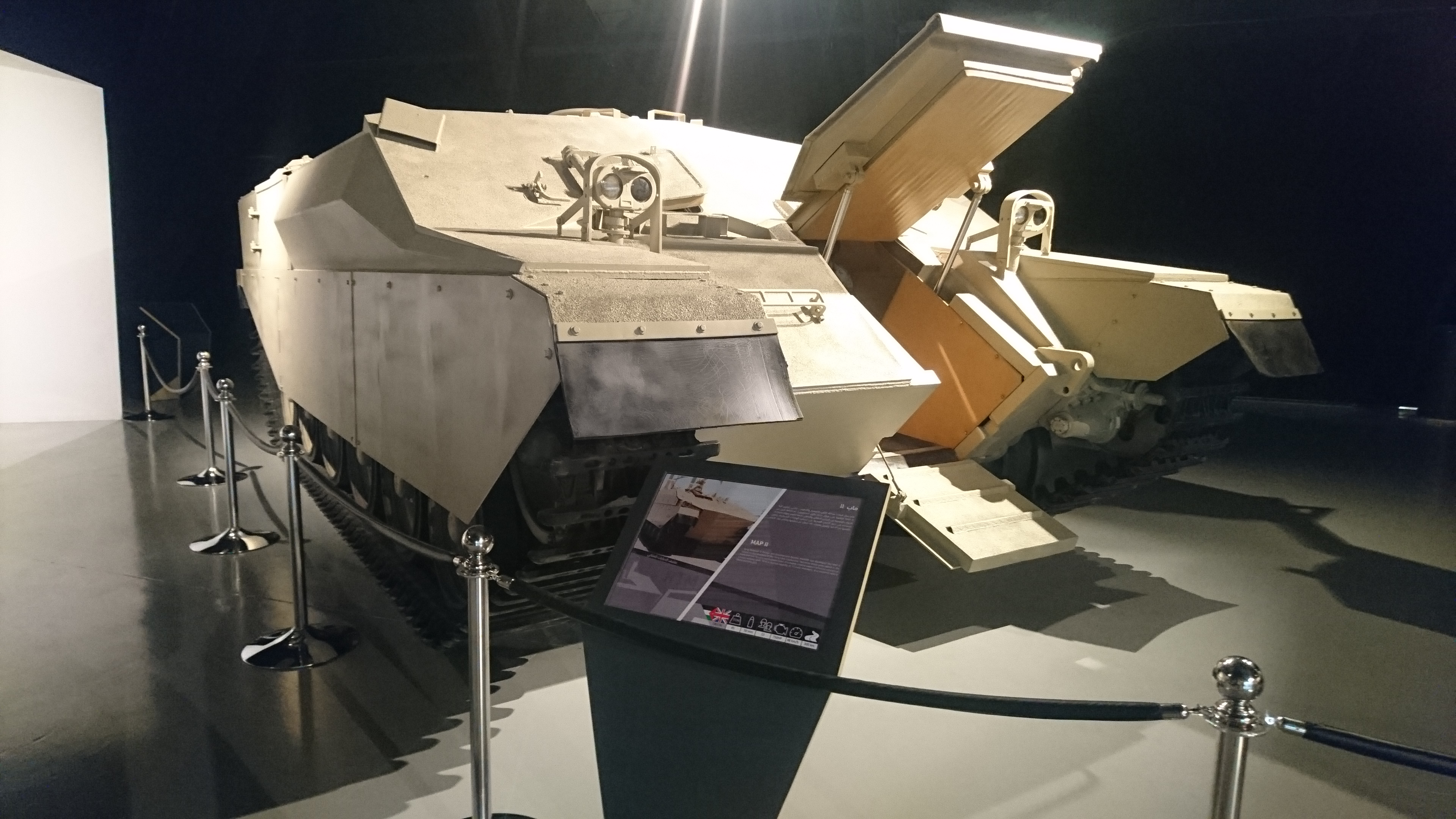
- MAP II exhibited at the Royal Tank Museum in Amman, Jordan
- Type: heavy armored personnel carrier
- Place of origin: Jordan

Service history
- Used by: Jordanian Army

Production history
- Designer: King Abdullah Design and Development Bureau
- Produced: 2014-present

Specifications
- Mass: 38 t
- Length: 8 m
- Width: 3,9 m
- Height: 2,2 m
- Main armament: remotely controlled weapons station (12.7mm machine gun+ Kornet-E)
- Secondary armament: machine gun 7,62 mm
- Engine: Continental AVDS-1790 diesel
- Operational range: 200 km
- Maximum speed: 60 km/h

Dawsar (Arabic: دوسر ) or MAP II (Modular Armored Platform) is a heavily armored personnel carrier developed by King Abdullah Design and Development Bureau (now Jordan Design and Development Bureau). It is based on Tariq main battle tank, an upgraded version of Centurion. The Jordanian Army received four of these vehicles in 2014.

The prime role of this vehicle is to support mechanized formation on the battlefield by accompanying main battle tanks. They are less vulnerable to anti-tank weapons than light APCs or IFVs. They may be used as a personnel carrier, ammunition carrier, armored ambulance and command post vehicle.

== Design ==
During conversion process the turret is removed. The vehicle is widened by 45 cm . Front and rear hatches are added, plus 4 roof hatches for observation, firing and emergency exit . The Dawsar can carry 13 soldiers with their gear. KADDB developed variants of the Dawsar such as a 120-mm mortar and ammunition carrier. In 2001 KADDB began producing Temsah Heavy APC. This vehicle is also based on Centurion tank .

== Protection ==
Dawsar heavy APC has a low profile hull. The sides are covered with massive side skirts. Dawsar provides full protection against medium calibere KE ammunition. Its protection is equal to that of a main battle tank. It is better protected than the M113 currently used by the Jordanian Army.

== Weapons ==
A Dawsar heavy APC armed with remotely controlled station is fitted with a 12.7mm machine gun and a Kornet-E anti-tank missile launcher. Another 7.62mm is on a different mount, operated by vehicle commander.

== Engine ==
Dawsar heavy APC is powered by one Continental AVDS-1790 supercharged diesel engine, developing 900 hp. This engine is used in American main battle tank and in Tariq MBT. It is mated to an Allison automatic transmission. Maximum range is 200 km.

== MAP ==
MAP
- Type: Armored Carrier
- Place of origin: Jordan

Production history
- Designer: King Abdullah Design and Development Bureau
- Variants: Open version, Closed version

Specifications
- Mass: 31t, 39t fully loaded
- Length: 7,8 m
- Width: 3,6 m
- Height: 2 m (hull top)
- Crew: 2 closed version, 3 open version
- Passengers: 10 (closed version only)
- Engine: AVDS-1790 V12 Turbocharged Diesel Engine; 750hp
- Power/weight: 18 kW/tonne (24 hp/tonne) (empty), 14 kW/tonne (19 hp/tonne) (loaded)
- Payload capacity: 8 t
- Transmission: Allison CD850-6 A
- Suspension: Hydro-pneumatic, swing-arm suspension
- Fuel capacity: 600 l
- Operational range: 200 km
- Maximum speed: 60 km/h

MAP was an earlier vehicle developed by KADDB, it was also built from the Centurion MBT. 2 different version were built, one version was closed, and the other version was still armored all around, but open at the top. Both versions had an elevation in which windows were installed. Each version was meant to fulfil a number of purposes:

=== Closed version ===
- Armoured Personnel Carrier (APC)
- Command Vehicle
- Tracked Ambulance
- Communications Vehicle
- Forward Observation Vehicle
- Armoured Workshop Vehicle

=== Open Version ===
- Mortar Carrier
- Spare Powerpack Carrier
- Ammunition Carrier
- Fuel Tanker
- General Purpose Load Vehicle

== Al-Dawsar 2016 upgrade ==
KADDB revealed an upgraded version of the Dawsar at the SOFEX 2016. This newer upgraded version has a capacity for 7 dismounts and a crew of 2, the seats can be arranged to seat up to 10 dismounts. The frontal door remains, the payload was increased to 10 tons and the vehicle should provide Level 5 STANAG 4569 of protection. The vehicle is heated and airconditioned. RPG protection and a camera for the driver can be installed optionally.

== Temsah ==
Temsah
- Place of origin: Jordan

Production history
- Designer: King Abdullah Design and Development Bureau, Mechanology Design Bureau, General Dynamics

Specifications
- Mass: 60 t
- Length: 8 m
- Width: 3,6 m
- Height: 2,2 m
- Crew: 2
- Passengers: 8
- Transmission: Allison CD-10006A
- Suspension: hydro pneumatic swing arm suspension system
- Fuel capacity: 950 l
- Operational range: 500 km
- Maximum speed: 48 km/h

Temsah (Arabic: تمساح, translates to Crocodile) is another conversion of the Centurion, developed by KADDB in cooperation with Mechanology Design Bureau and General Dynamics. The Centurion is used in reverse, the rear and front of the hull where swapped to add a rear ramp. Two armament layouts were planned, a turret consisting of 12.7mm a machine gun and ZT3 Ingwe and the other one consisting of the M621 cannon, Anti-tank missile launchers and a coaxial machine gun. The vehicle is meant to be used alongside main battle tanks and can be used as a tracked ambulance and command post.

== See also ==
- BMO-T
- Namer
- IDF Achzarit
- Nagmachon
- Nakpadon
- Tarmour
- Sabiex
