= Namer =

Israeli heavy armoured personnel carrier

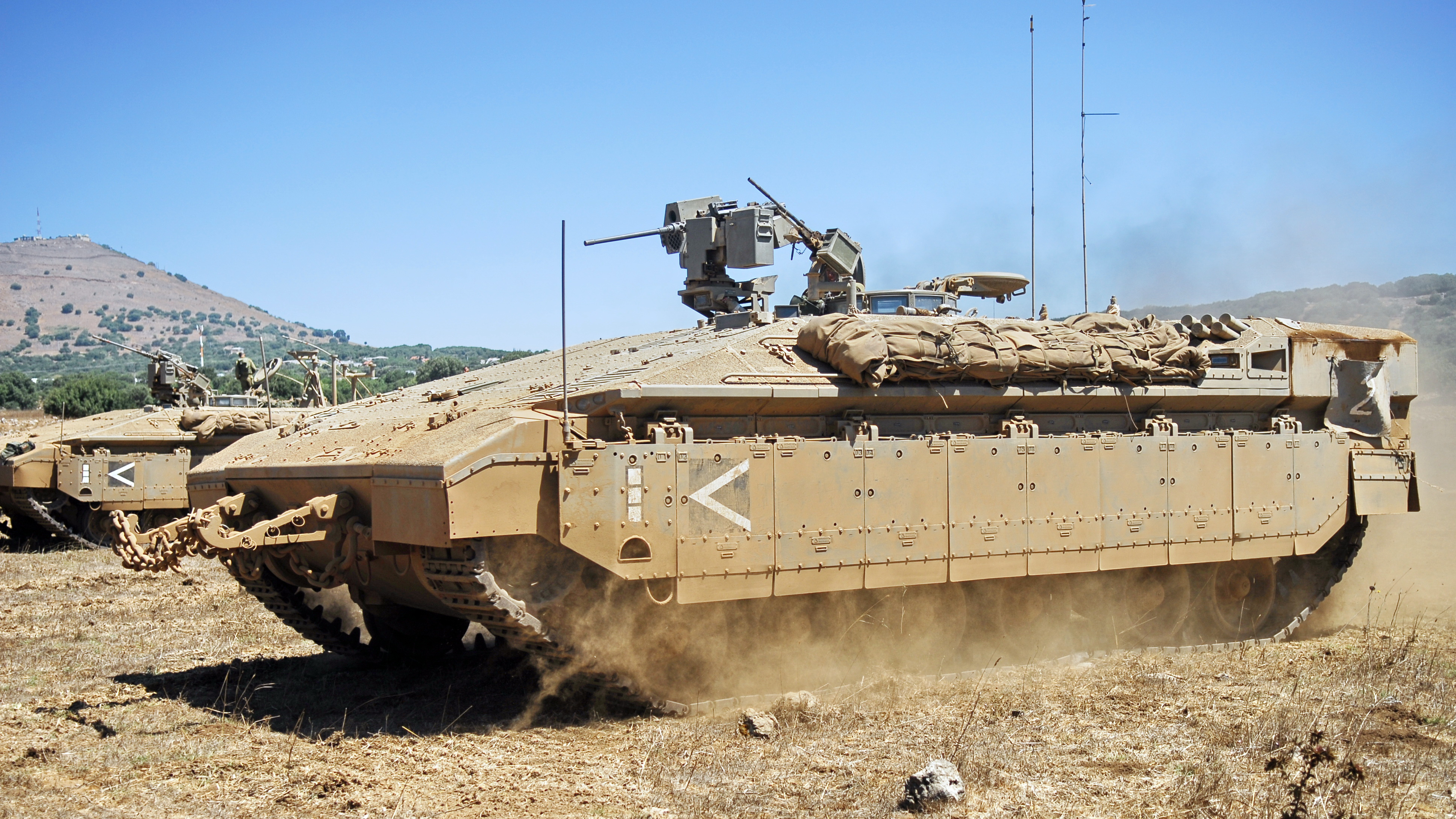
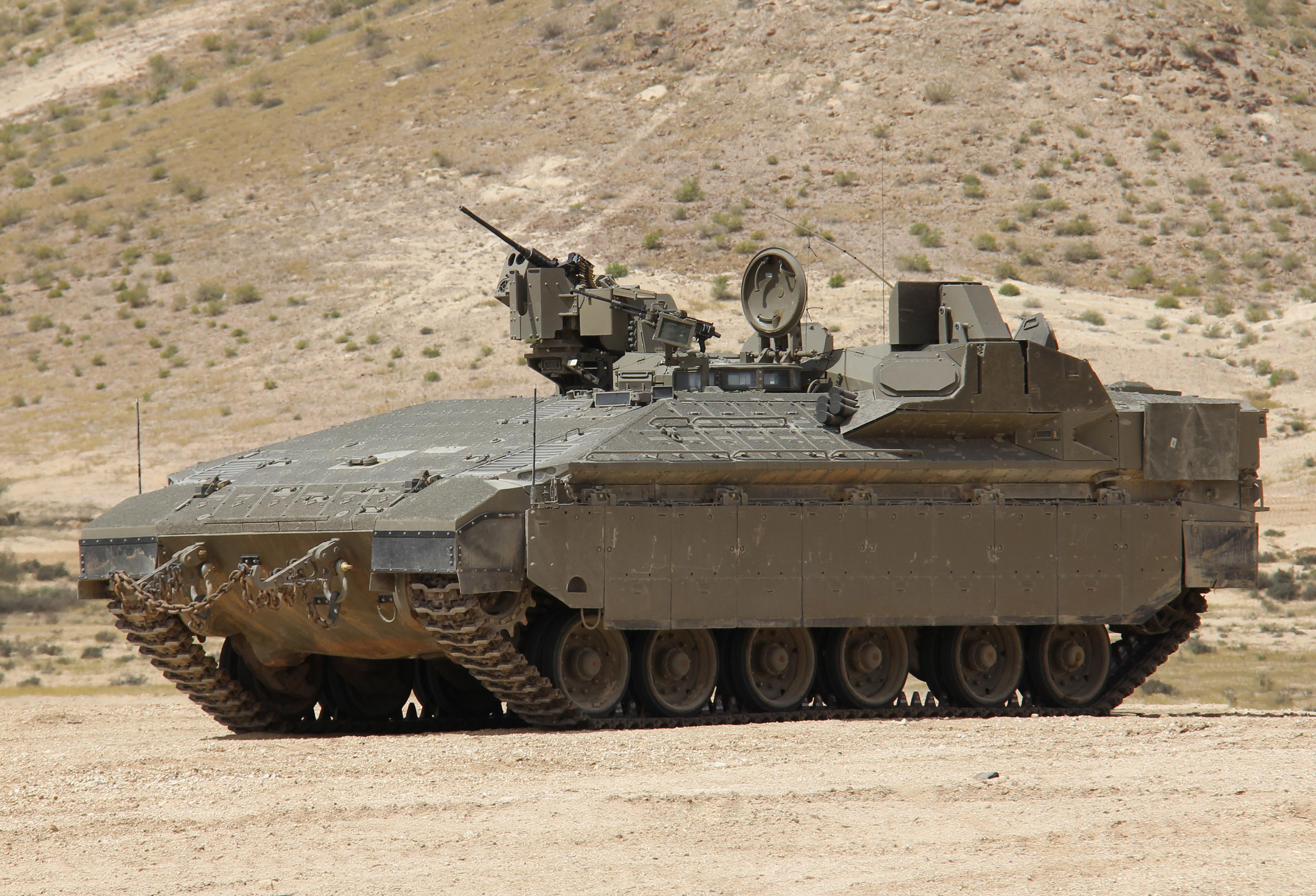
- Top: Namer HAPC in a drill, armed with a M2 Browning on RCWS. Bottom: Namer with Trophy (Windbreaker) APS and M2 Browning.
- Type: Heavy armoured personnel carrier
- Place of origin: Israel

Service history
- In service: 2008–present
- Used by: Israel Defense Forces
- Wars: Gaza War (2008–2009); Operation Protective Edge; Gaza war; 2026 Lebanon War

Production history
- Designer: Israel Military Industries
- Manufacturer: IDF Ordnance (assembler)
- Unit cost: $5 million
- Produced: 2008–present
- No. built: Up to 290 are currently operational; 531 in total planned to be produced by 2027

Specifications
- Mass: 60+ tonnes
- Crew: 3 (commander, driver, RCWS operator) + 9 troops
- Armor: Classified composite matrix of laminated ceramic–steel–nickel alloy + underlaid reactive armour. Sloped modular design.
- Main armament: Samson RCWS equipped with either 12.7 mm (0.50 in) M2 machine gun or Mk 19 grenade launcher
- Secondary armament: 1 × 7.62 mm (0.300 in) FN MAG MG; 1 × 60 mm (2.4 in) external mortar; 12 × smoke grenades
- Engine: 1,200 hp (895 kW) turbocharged diesel engine
- Power/weight: 20 hp/tonne (15 kW/tonne)
- Payload capacity: 9 infantrymen
- Suspension: Helical spring
- Operational range: 500 km (310 mi)
- Maximum speed: 85.2 km/h (50 mph)

Namer (Hebrew: נָמֵר, pronounced [naˈmeʁ]; meaning "leopard," and also a syllabic abbreviation of "Nagmash" (APC) and "Merkava") is an Israeli armoured personnel carrier based on a Merkava Mark IV tank chassis. Namer was developed by and is being assembled by the Israeli Ordnance Corps. It has entered service in limited numbers with the Israel Defense Forces since the end of 2008. Due to budgetary constraints, the introduction of the Namer into the IDF has been slow, leaving the ground forces dependent on the M113 until 2027.

== History ==
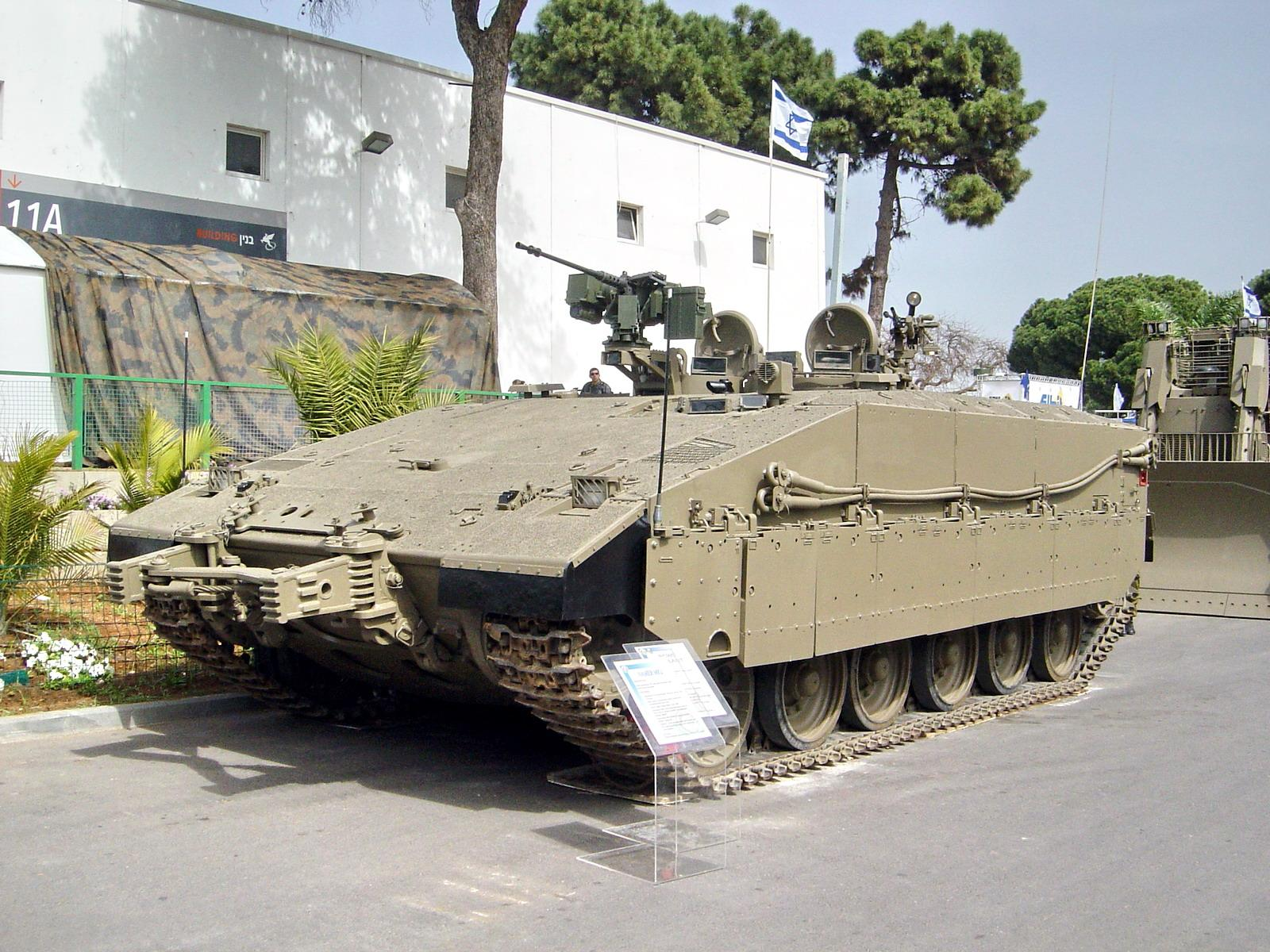
Namer prototype based on Merkava Mark I. Notice the straight side of the hull.

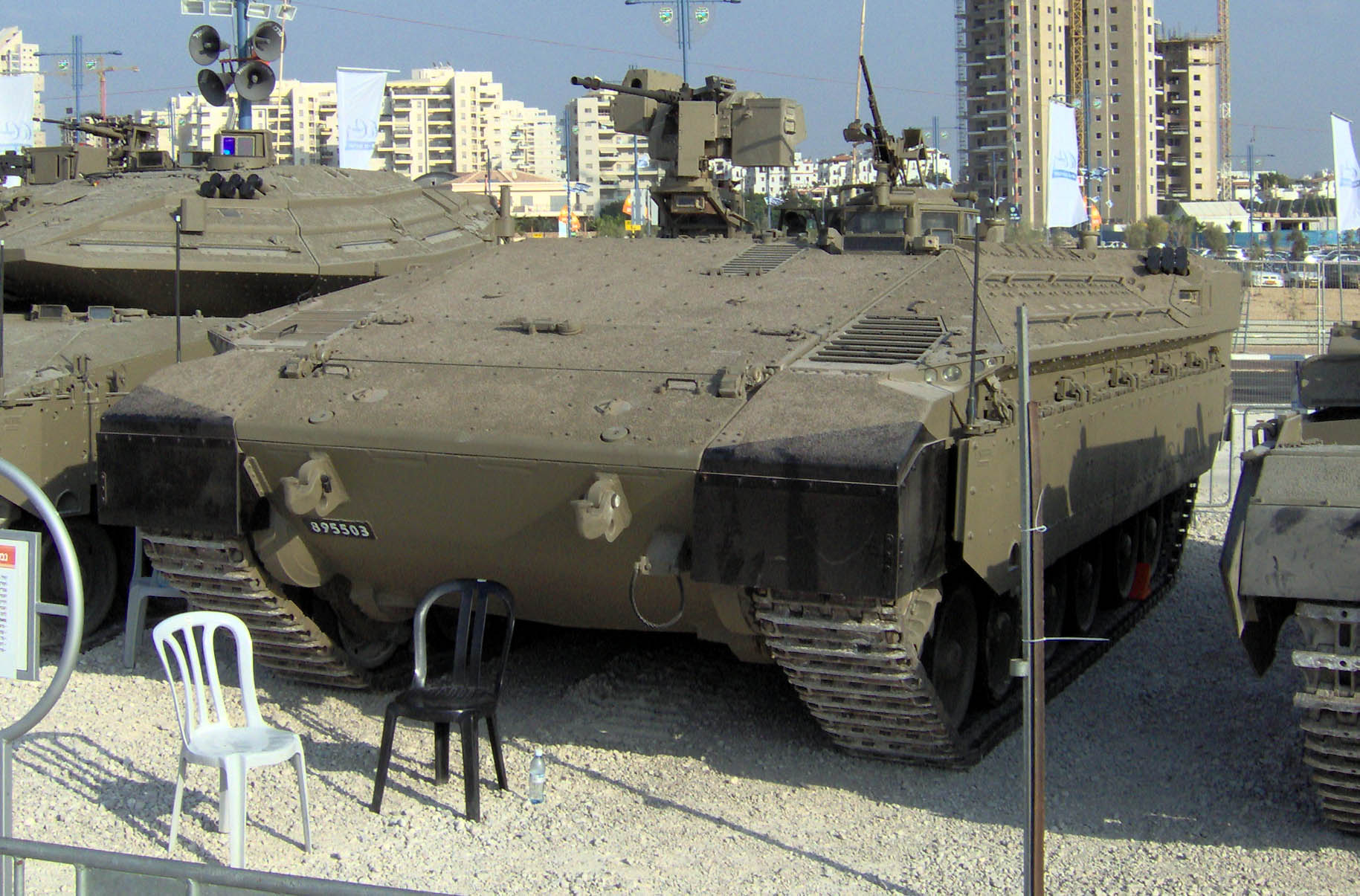
Operational Namer based on Merkava Mark IV. Notice the sloped side of the hull.

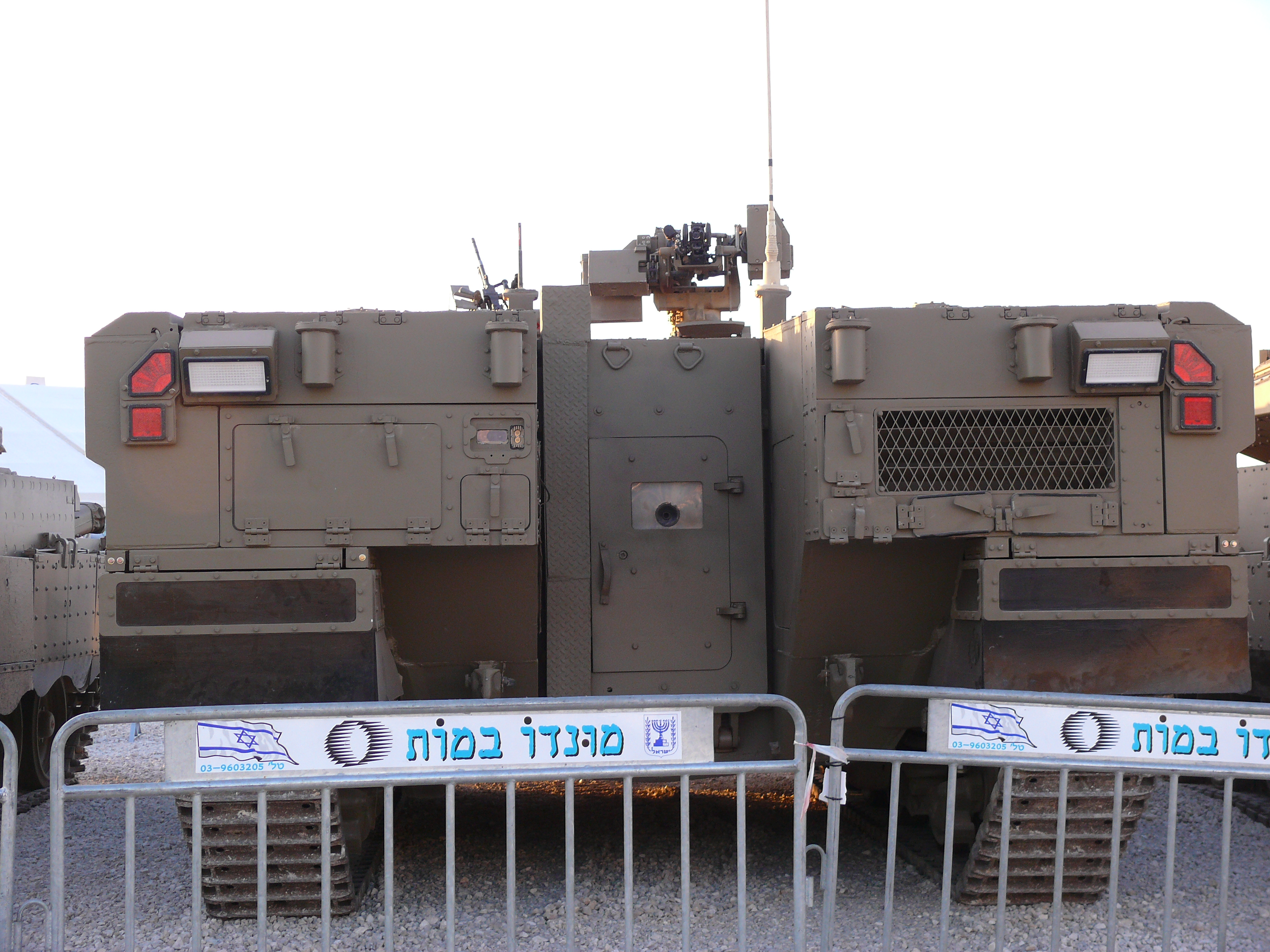
Rear of Namer showing the ramp which replaced the clamshell doors

=== 1990s–2004 ===
The experience of converting Centurion tanks into armoured personnel carriers (Nagmashot, Nagmachon) and combat engineering vehicles (Puma, Nakpadon), followed by the conversion of many T-54 and T-55 tanks into Achzarit infantry fighting vehicles, further promoted the idea of converting Merkava tanks into heavily armoured APCs / IFVs. This concept was also driven by the fact that many of the ~250 Merkava Mark I tanks were being withdrawn from service, and it was also made clear that the 105 mm armament of the Merkava Mark IIs could not be upgraded with the modern IMI 120 mm gun.

The development did not progress much in the 1990s due to funding issues, but following 2004 Israel–Gaza conflict, which exposed the vulnerability of the M113 armored personnel carrier to improvised explosive devices and rocket-propelled grenades, the IDF reconsidered the development. At that point, the Stryker armoured personnel carrier was considered, but was rejected by the IDF.

=== 2005–present ===
Eventually, IDF Ordnance developed infantry fighting vehicle prototypes based on the Merkava Mark I chassis, and also a handful of IFVs based on the Merkava Mark IV chassis. The vehicle was initially called Nemmera (Hebrew: leopardess), but later renamed to Namer (Hebrew: leopard), while the name Nemmera refers to a Merkava-based ARV.

On 15 February 2005, Maariv reported that a Namer prototype based on the Merkava Mark I was fielded by the Givati Brigade for trials and evaluation. It was equipped with a Rafael Overhead Weapon Station, which is remotely controlled and loaded from within the vehicle. This same unit was demonstrated at the Eurosatory 2005 military exhibition, where potential export customers showed interest.

Lessons learned in the battles of the 2006 Lebanon War also largely validated this program. Consequently, in 2007, it was reported that the first fifteen Namers would be delivered in 2008, and over a hundred more would finally equip two combat brigades. However, conversion plans were abandoned in favor of newly built Merkava Mark IV chassis.

The Namer was the first IDF vehicle designed by computer (CAD), which allowed it to be conceptualized more rapidly than previous vehicles.

On 1 March 2008, the IDF officially presented a Namer IFV that was operational, fully-developed, and built ab initio based on the Merkava Mark IV chassis. Reportedly, the construction was expedited in May 2008 by importing parts from the US. On 15 September 2008, the Namer was unveiled to the general public at an exhibition in Rishon LeZion.

To speed up the production of the Namers (which had been taking place domestically), on 25 October 2010, it was announced that General Dynamics Land Systems had been chosen to negotiate a contract to manufacture and integrate an unspecified number of vehicle hulls at the Joint Systems Manufacturing Center in Lima, Ohio.

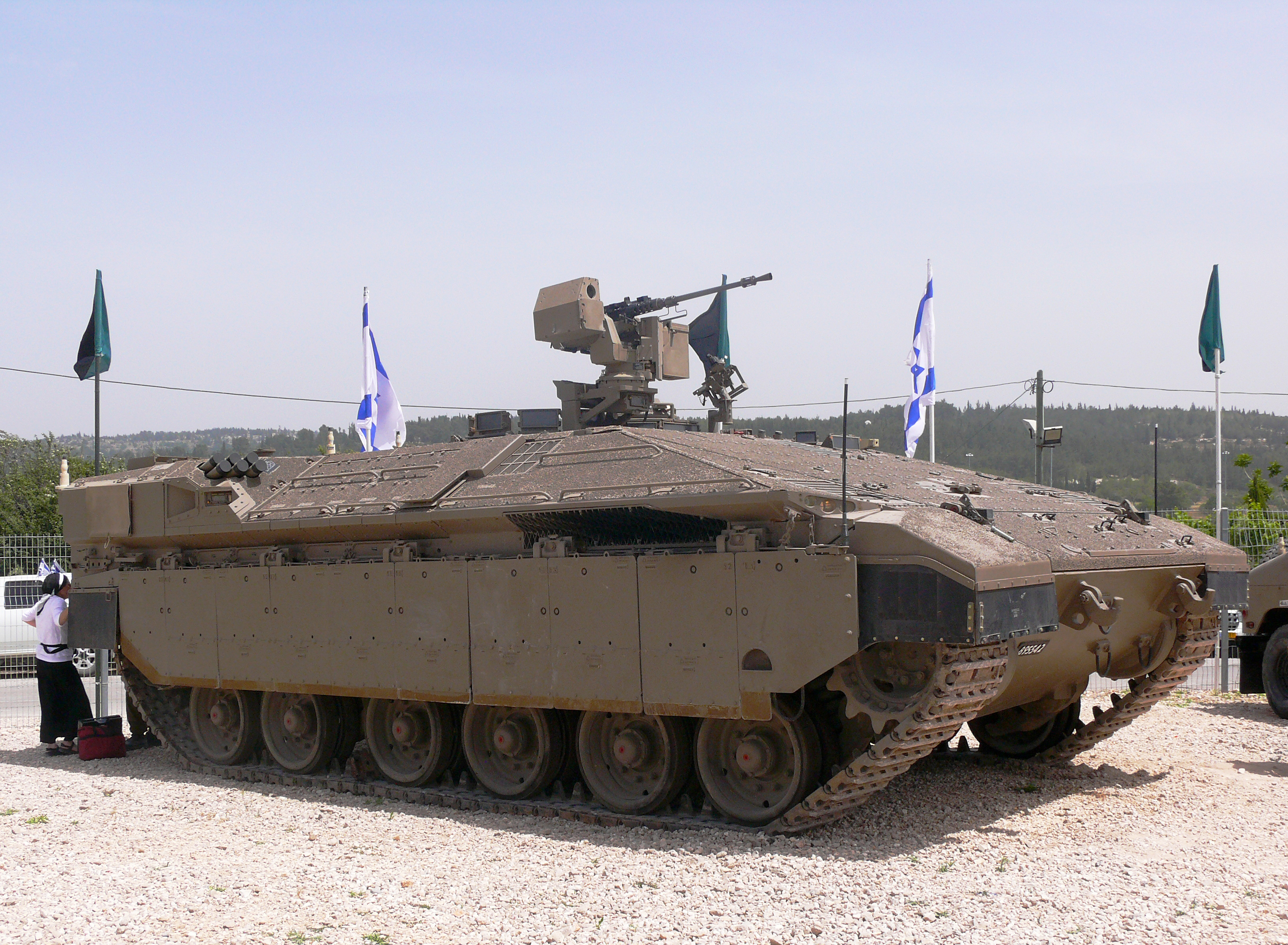
Namer in Yad La-Shiryon, Latrun

After cutting back orders for the Namer in 2014 due to budget constraints, in 2015, the IDF increased its orders for parts, in expectation of orders of complete systems. The decision resulted partly as a response to the death of seven Golani Brigade soldiers, who were killed by an RPG in Gaza while riding a Vietnam War-era M113 whose engine stalled in the middle of the battlefield. The orders from General Dynamics occurred alongside domestic production of the vehicles.

The Namer was originally planned to be equipped with Israel Military Industries's Iron Fist active protection system; however, due to budget limitations, the installation of an active protection system was delayed. In 2016, nearly a decade later than planned, the IDF said that it would begin to fit newly built Namers with Rafael's Trophy active protection system.

The IDF has continuously cut orders for the Namer due to budgetary constraints and a lack of prioritization of ground forces. Since 2014, the pace of Namer purchases has been considered slow, with around 30 being produced each year, meaning that there would not be 500 of the vehicles in the IDF until 2027.

On 6 March 2016, the Jerusalem Post reported that all new Namers would be delivered with the Trophy active protection system, and that the quantity of Namers ordered had been doubled from the previous year.

At the end of 2016, the IDF Combat Engineering Corps started to operate the Namer CEV (Hebrew: אוֹנָנוּת הנדסי – נמר"ה). The Namer CEV is equipped with the Trophy active protection system and engineering devices, such as: mine rollers, bulldozer blades, and anti-mine CARPET rockets. In 2023, the Namer CEV was used in the war in Gaza.

== Design ==
=== Survivability ===
The Namer has been designed for survivability and rapid repair, with modular armor, V-hull belly armor pack, and CBRN defense.

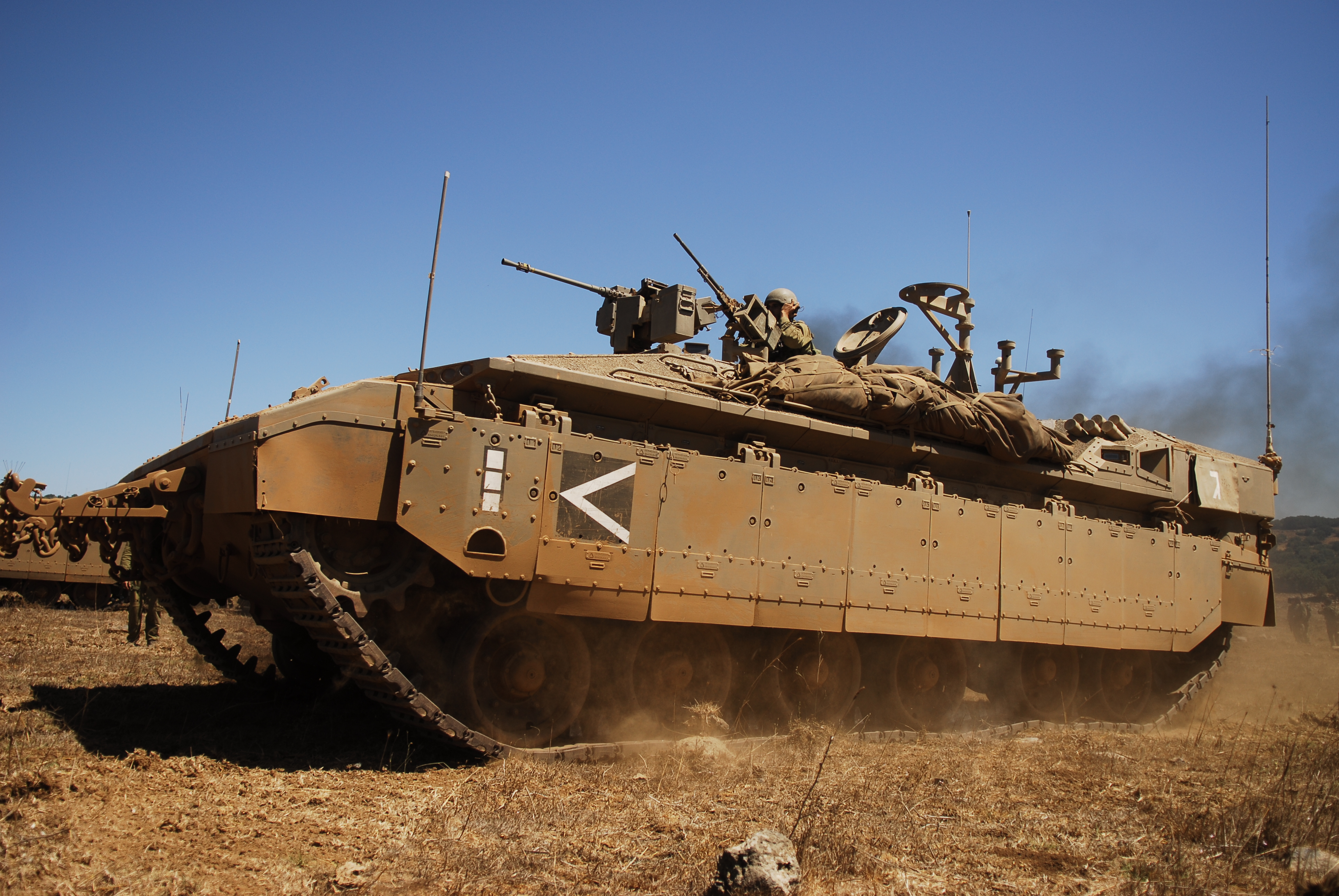
Namer during training

According to Brigadier general Yaron Livnat, they are more heavily armored than the Merkava IV tanks: "The weight saved by eliminating the turret was 'reinvested' in beefing up the armor."

From 2016 onwards, some Namers were planned to be equipped with the Trophy active protection system.

In 2015, Israel's defense ministry stated: "The Namer is considered to be the most protected armored combat vehicle in the world, which proved its abilities during fighting in Operation Protective Edge against many threats." Consequently, the IDF planned to introduce more of the Namers into the army over the next decade, as replacements for the dated M113s currently in service.

=== Armament ===
Namers are armed with either an M2 Browning machine gun or an Mk 19 grenade launcher mounted on a Samson Remote Controlled Weapon Station, as well as a 7.62 mm (FN MAG) machine gun and a 60 mm mortar. Smoke grenade launchers are also carried.

On 31 July 2017, the Israeli Defense Ministry (IDF) released video of an infantry fighting vehicle version of the Namer, fitted with an unmanned turret armed with a 30 mm cannon; the turret is equipped with the Trophy APS. The Namer IFV offers more firepower for infantry units, and provides a better response in urban combat operations.

On 12 December 2018, the Israeli Defense ministry released a further video of the Namer IFV that showed it launching two Spike-MR missiles from a pod which can be erected from and lowered flush into the turret roof. A defense ministry spokesperson explained that the installation “will enable IDF soldiers to fire missiles from within the vehicles, while they are still protected, which will significantly increase the attack range of the vehicles.” The automated launch pod will also be fitted to the turret of the Eitan AFV.

=== Capabilities ===
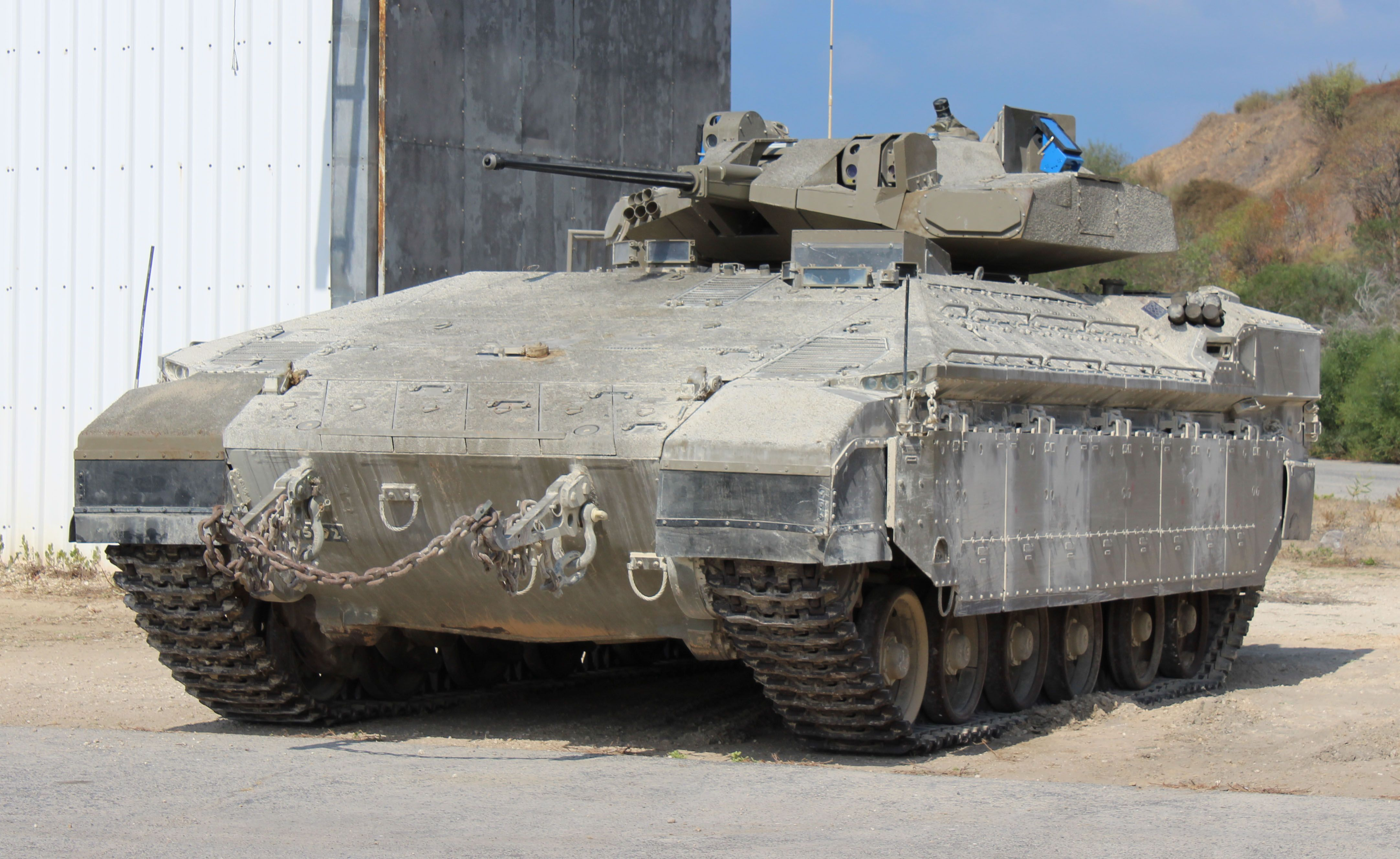
Namer IFV version

Namer is capable of maneuvering in difficult terrain, powered by the Teledyne Continental AVDS-1790-9AR 1,200 hp (895 kW) V12 air-cooled diesel engine of the Merkava Mark III. Namer is able to carry up to 12 troops (crewmen and fully equipped infantrymen) and one stretcher, or two stretchers and medical equipment on a Namerbulance MEDEVAC version. The original Merkava Mark IV rear entrance was redesigned to be a wider door ramp with a sniper port. Two hatches are fitted on the roof, which is higher than Merkava's hull roof. Namer also shares a digital battlefield management system with Merkava Mark IV, giving it hunter-killer team capabilities.

=== Namer CEV ===
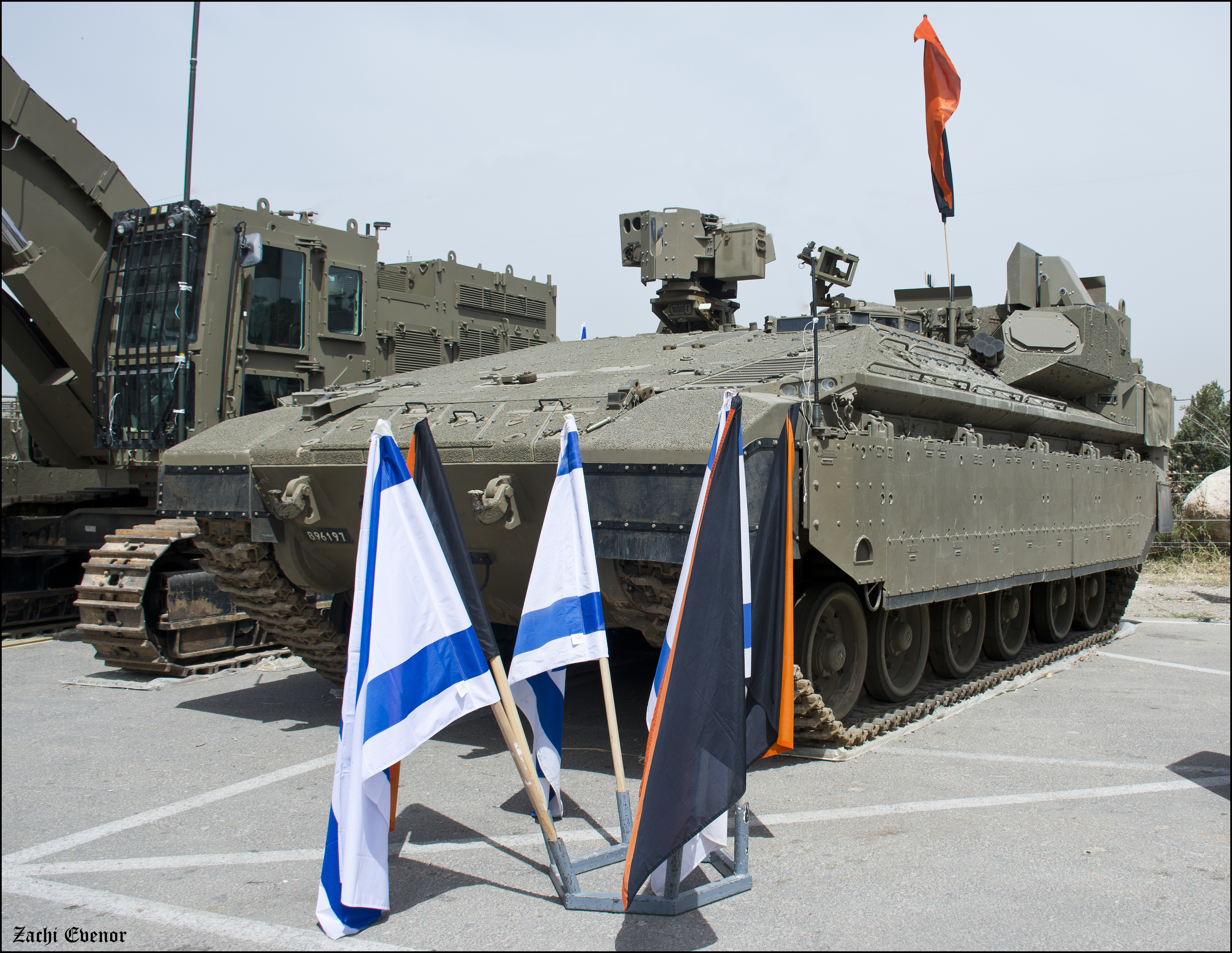
Namer CEV version in Yad La-Shiryon 69th Independence Day exhibition

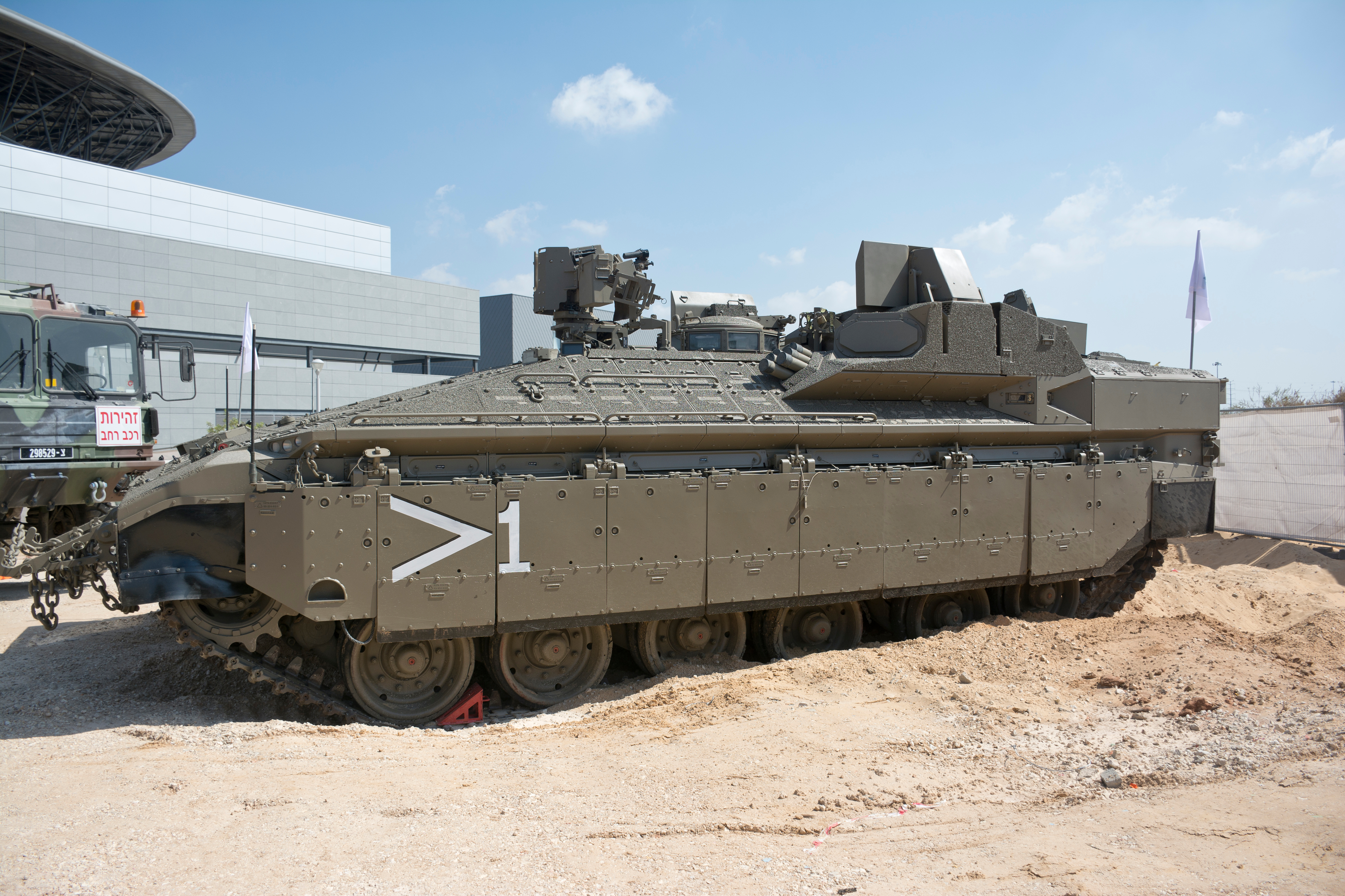
Namer CEV in IDF exhibition, 2018

On 13 April 2016, the Israeli Defense Ministry released video and photos of combat engineering versions of the Namer undergoing testing. There are three combat engineering derivatives: a bulldozer version to be operated by company commanders; a breaching and obstacle bridging version to be operated by platoon commanders; and a towing version to be operated by platoon sergeants. Additional engineering devices, such as CARPET mine-breaching rockets, can be installed per mission. Combat engineering Namers are equipped with the Trophy APS, and would endow brigade-level teams with capabilities they never had before to handle tunnels, bridge obstacles, and maneuver in high-threat areas. The Namer CEV entered service in the end 2016, at Battalion 603 of the Combat Engineering Corps, and is projected to enter service of the 601st Battalion in 2021.

== Combat history ==
In 2014, Namers took part in Operation Protective Edge. During the fighting, Namers (which at the time were not fitted with Active and Soft Protection Systems) were hit multiple times by RPGs and ATGMs, including suffering direct hits by 9M133 Kornet ATGMs. In another case, an explosive charge weighing between ½ to 1 ton of explosives was detonated near the Namer, and a house collapsed on the APC. As a result of its success on the battlefield, there were calls for the number of vehicles to be increased (beyond the 170 on order), and for them to gradually replace the many M113s currently fielded by IDF combat units. In 2023, Namers took part in Operation Swords of Iron. On 21 October 2023, eleven soldiers from the Givati Infantry Brigade's Tzabar Battalion were killed after their Namer was struck by an ATGM. On 15 June 2024, eight soldiers were killed, possibly due to a detonation of the explosives carried on the exterior of their Namer. On June 24, 2024, Al-Qassam Brigades published footage of its forces attacking a Namer using a Chinese HJ-8 ATGM, hitting the vehicle, causing an external fire on the carry-on CARPET demining system.

== Users ==
- Israel — According to IDF, the Namer IFV is set be distributed to infantry and combat engineering forces, with possible future plans for special models for intelligence and command purposes. Two Namers took part in the Gaza War as part of the Golani Brigade. By 2014, there were up to 120 Namers in service, and they took part in Operation Protective Edge. The Namer CEV (combat engineering vehicle) entered service in the end of 2016. According to a 2022 estimate, the IDF had about 290 Namers.

== Export proposals ==
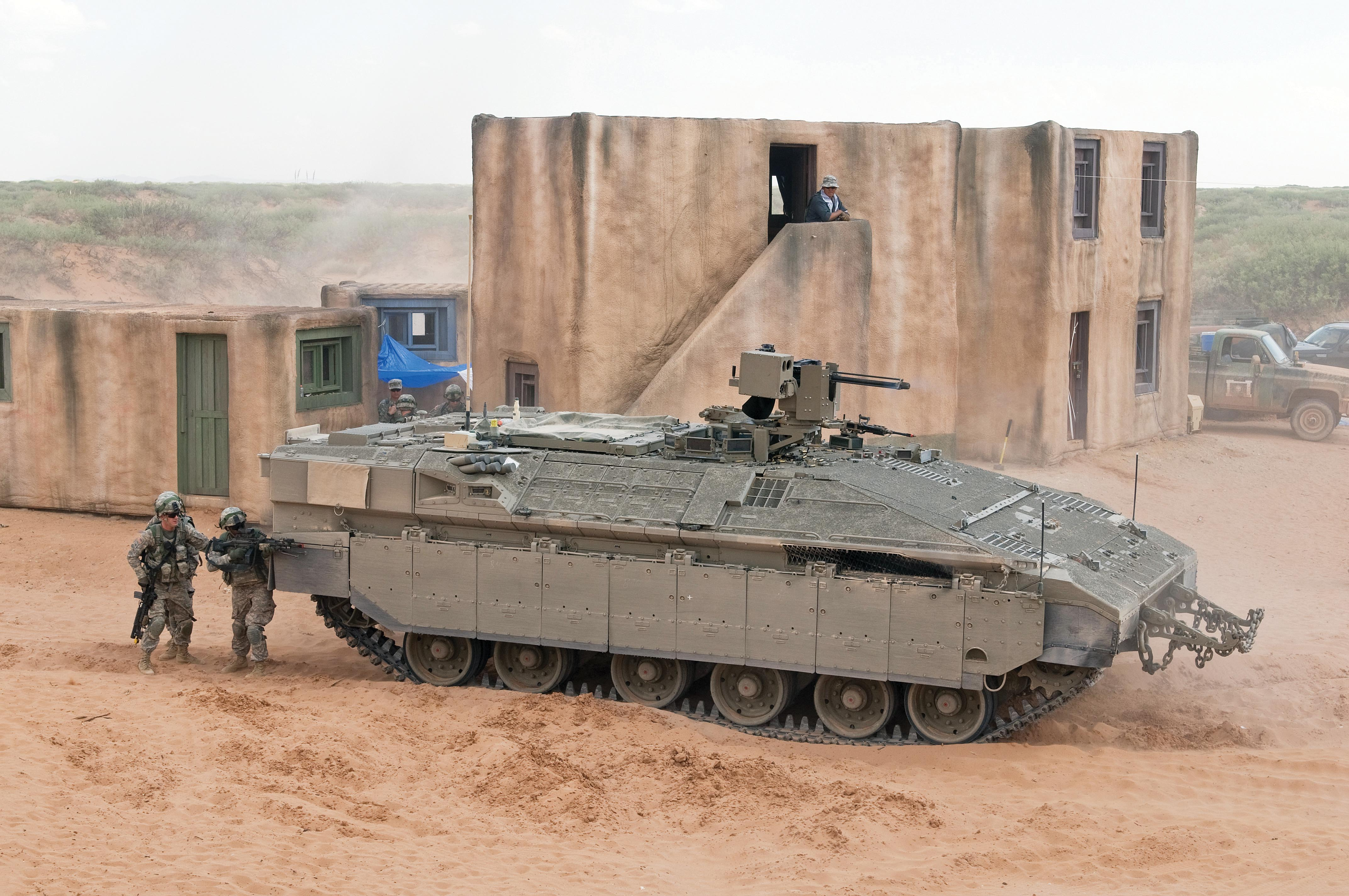
A Namer during a U.S. operational assessment in 2012

- Azerbaijan — Azerbaijan and Israel have conducted negotiations over the Namer vehicle.
- Colombia — Israel has offered procurement of Namer APCs to Colombia.
- United States — In 2012, the U.S. Army conducted non-developmental vehicle operational assessments of current combat vehicles to evaluate capabilities against requirements for purchase of a new IFV for the Ground Combat Vehicle program. One of the vehicles validated was the Namer. In April 2013, the Congressional Budget Office released a report that advised purchasing current vehicles instead of developing a new vehicle for the GCV program. Buying the Namer would cost $9 billion less, and meet the required nine-man carrying capacity. The Army responded by saying that although the Namer and other vehicles assessed in 2012 met some GCV requirements, no currently fielded vehicle met enough without needing significant redesign.

== See also ==
- Nagmachon – (Israel)
- Achzarit – (Israel)
- Nakpadon – (Israel)
- Ajax – (United Kingdom)
- Griffin III – (United States)
- Lynx KF41 – (Germany)
- Puma – (Germany)
- T-15 Armata – (Russia)
- Tulpar – (Turkey)
- VN20 – (China)
- BTR-T – (Russia)
- Vikram VT21 – (India)
