= Nakpadon =

Israeli heavy armoured personnel carrier

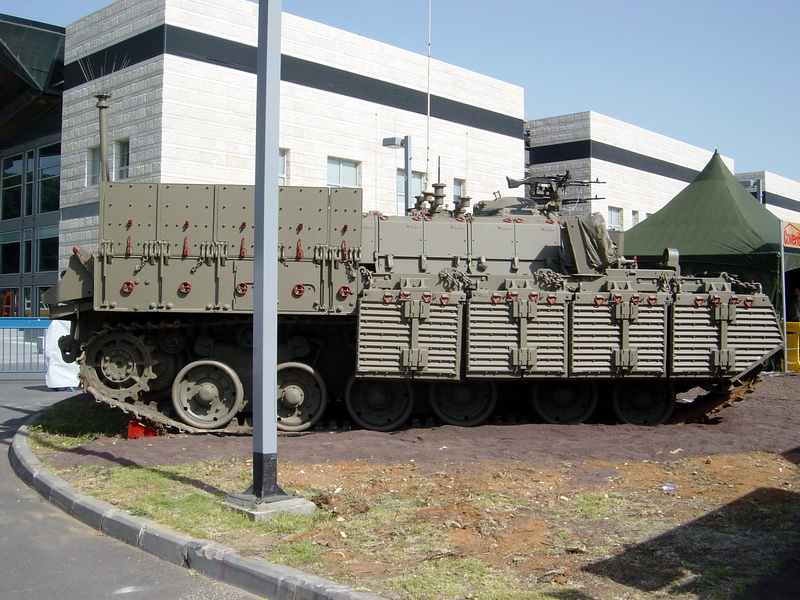
- Type: Heavy Armoured Personnel Carrier
- Place of origin: Israel

Specifications
- Armor: 3rd generation reactive armor, "EKE" side skirts
- Main armament: 4 x FN MAG GPMG, 1 x 40mm grenade launcher

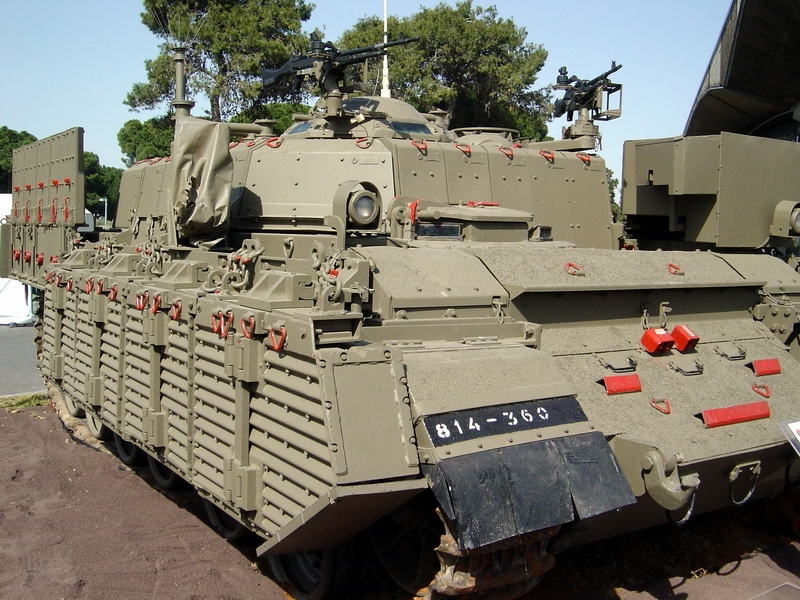
Nakpadon, closer view

Nakpadon is an Israeli heavy armored personnel carrier based on the Centurion-derived Nagmachon.

== History ==
The creation and development of the Nakpadon started during fighting in Lebanon. It was first introduced during the late 1990s, and has since served in southern Lebanon, the West Bank, and the Gaza region.

The Nakpadon is an improved version of the Nagmashot and Nagmachon which includes 3rd generation reactive armor and side skirts of constructed of armor capable of protection against Enhanced Kinetic Energy projectiles (EKE). Similar to USMC LTVP7 armor. The rear section of side skirts can be raised or lowered. It is shielded against mines and anti-vehicle missiles. The Nakpadon can hold ~10 troops and is equipped with four machine guns. Due to greater armor protection, it is heavier than prior iterations of this vehicle, weighing around 55 tons. To compensate for this added weight, a more powerful engine has been utilized.

== Technical improvements ==
Improvements over the Nagmashon include 3rd generation reactive armor and "EKE" side skirts with rear skirts that can be raised or lowered. The Nakpadon carries four FN MAG machine guns and a 40 mm grenade launcher.

== See also ==
- Puma armored engineering vehicle – Israeli combat engineering vehicle / APC
- IDF Achzarit – Israeli armoured personnel carrier
- Namer – Israeli heavy armoured personnel carrier
- Dawsar – Jordanian heavy armored personnel carrier
