= Technology and Maintenance Corps (Israel) =

- חיל הטכנולוגיה והאחזקה
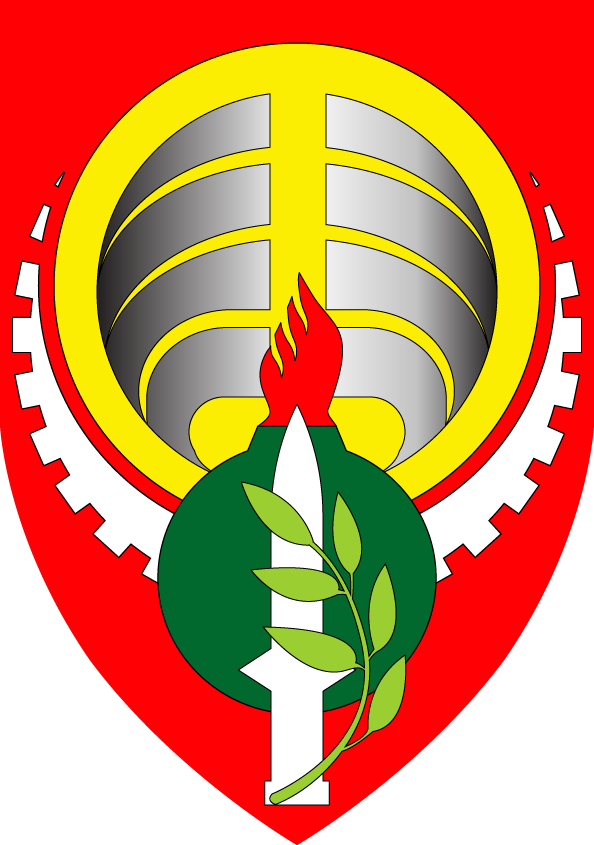
- Technology and Maintenance Corps insignia
- Active: 1948–present
- Country: Israel
- Allegiance: Israel Defense Forces

Commanders
- Current commander: Tat Aluf Ariel Shima, Aviv & Jacob

Insignia
- Flag

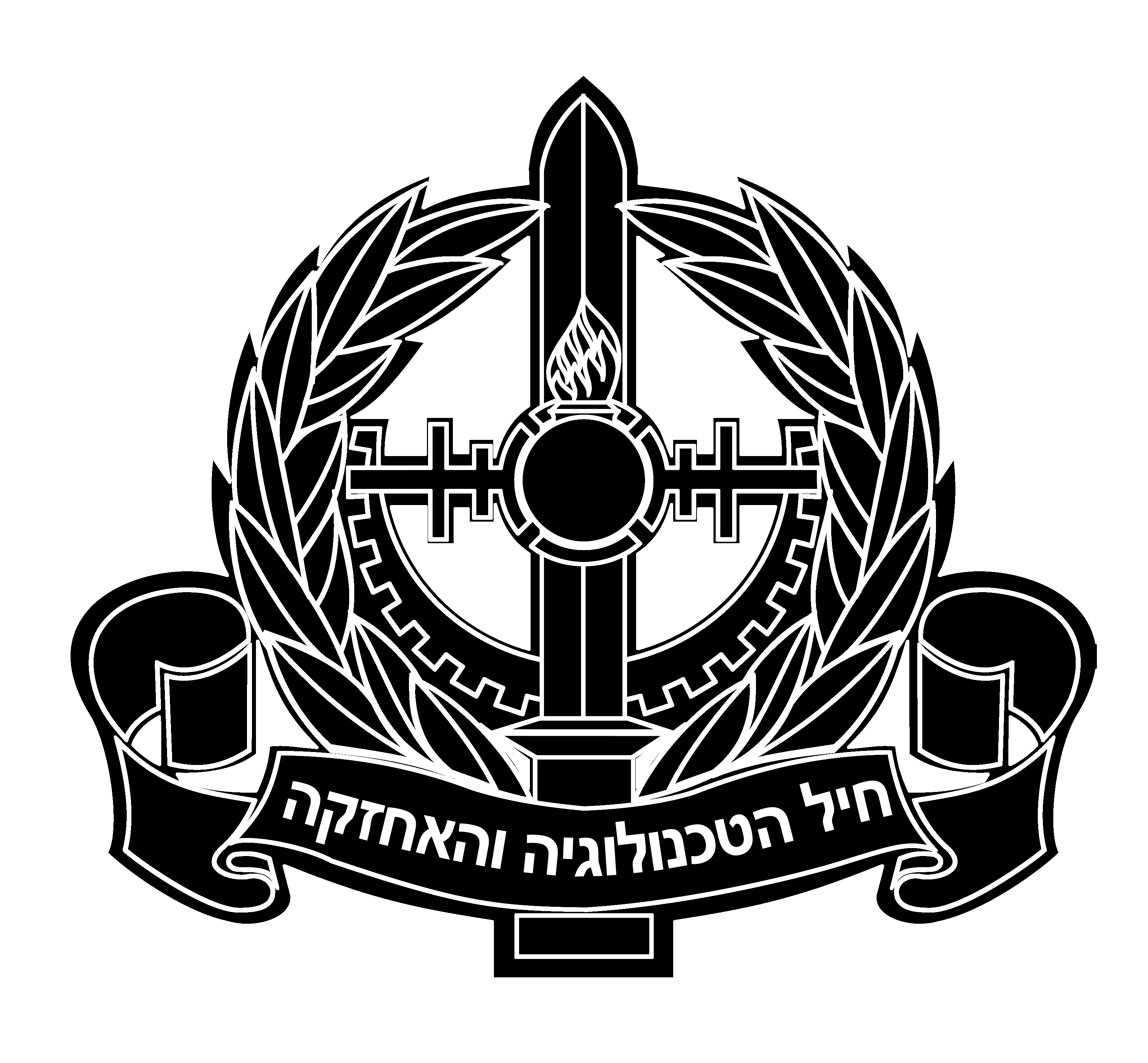
- Emblem

The Israeli Technology and Maintenance Corps (Hebrew: חיל הטכנולוגיה והאחזקה, Heil HaTekhnologya VeHaAhzaka) is a combat-support corps in the IDF GOC Army Headquarters. Before the Israeli Technological and Logistics Directorate was dismantled, it fell under its jurisdiction. The corps is responsible for the development and maintenance of war materiel, combat-support materials, and other systems.

== History ==
In 1941, the Haganah's Ordnance Department (מחלקת החימוש, Mahleket Himush, abbr. Mahash) was founded. It engaged in the purchasing, concealment, and transport of materiel, in cooperation with Israel Military Industries, created in 1933. It was headed by Asher "Oshraka" Peled, who also served in the British army. The Ordnance Department sold concealed weapons to the Yishuv, in accordance with the budget of each village. The British wrote that "There is a weapon to arm every combatant". The first ordnance course took place in Ju'ara, the Haganah's central training camp in 1942. In 1943 another course was held in Ruhama.

In January 1948, the Ordnance Department was renamed into the Ordnance Service (שירות החימוש). During the 1948 Arab–Israeli War, the service's first "Basic Workshops" were established to help restore and improve vehicles. In 1951, the Engineering Corps was renamed into the Ordnance Corps.

During the Suez War, the corps rescued, collected and restored materiel. After the war, the first Ordnance Battalion was created. In the War of Attrition, the corps engaged in many rescue attempts. During the Yom Kippur War, the corps was able to restore and bring into service damaged war materiel. The pace of repair proved decisive. During the 1982 Lebanon War, the corps designated two regional ordnance units within Lebanon, and the Merkava tank, developed under the corps and manufactured by the IMI, was tested in battle for the first time.

Ordnance Corps logo (before 2015)

Following the Al-Aqsa Intifada in 2000, new defenses were added to Armoured fighting vehicles. Several vehicles underwent upgrades, among these: upper turrets for the Nagmachon, Achzarit, and Centurion tank-chassis Puma CEV; mini-turrets for Merkava tanks; further defences to the IDF Caterpillar D9 (added cage armor); and the development of the "Scorpion," a Landing Bridge tank converted into a combat engineering tank able to carry a portable pillbox.

In 2016, the corps' name was changed from Ordnance Corps (חיל החימוש, Heil HaHimush) to Technology and Maintenance Corps.

== Structure ==
The corps' training base (Bahad 20) is located in Tzrifin. Other units do not fall directly under the corps’ command, but are professionally affiliated with it:

- The Center for Maintenance and Restoration is the main centre for holding war materiel, including the factory where the Merkava tank is manufactured.
- The Center for Combat Spare Parts administers the supply of spare parts to the IDF in ten bases.
- The Unit for Quality Assurance and Experiments conducts quality control and other experiments in two principal experiment bases and several other smaller, temporary bases.
- The Central Regional Ordnance Supply Unit 650 (formerly 652) provides ordnance to the Central Command, including forces stationed in the West Bank.
- The Northern Regional Ordnance Supply Unit 651 provides ordnance to the Northern Command.
- The Southern Regional Ordnance Supply Unit 653 provides ordnance to the Southern Command.

== Commanders ==
Below is a list of all Chief Ordnance Officers:

Rank	Name	Years
Colonel	Asher Peled	1948–1949
Lieutenant Colonel	Zvi Ben-Ya'akov	1949–1950
Colonel	Dov Shemer	1950–1951
Colonel	Immanuel Prat	1951–1954
Colonel later Maj. Gen.	Amos Horev	1954–1962
Colonel	Inon Azruni	1963–1965
Brigadier General	Haim Domi	1966–1973
Brigadier General	Eliezer Barak	1973–1978
Brigadier General	Ben Zion Ben Bashat	1978–1983
Brigadier General	Toviah Margalit	1983–1985
Brigadier General	Moshe Keidar	1985–1988
Brigadier General	Zvi Oren	1988–1992
Brigadier General later Maj. Gen.	Ami Sagis	1991–1995
Brigadier General	Michael Dayan	1995–1998
Brigadier General	Shalom Koren	1998–2000
Brigadier General	Zekharia Hai	2000–2003
Brigadier General	Haim Ronen	2003–2007
Brigadier General	Eyal Alok	2007–2010
Brigadier General	Tzvika Kraous	2010–2014
Brigadier General	Eliezer Ben Harush	2014–2017
Brigadier General	Mishel Yanko	2017–2019
Brigadier General	Ilan Eliya	2019–2022
Brigadier General	Ariel Shima	2022–present

== Bibliography ==
- Roy, Natan; Klein, Ze'ev (1982). "Ordnance Corps". In Yehuda Schiff (ed.). IDF in its Corps: Army and Security Encyclopedia (in Hebrew). Vol. 13. Revivim Publishing.
