= Puma armored engineering vehicle =

Israeli combat engineering vehicle / APC

Puma
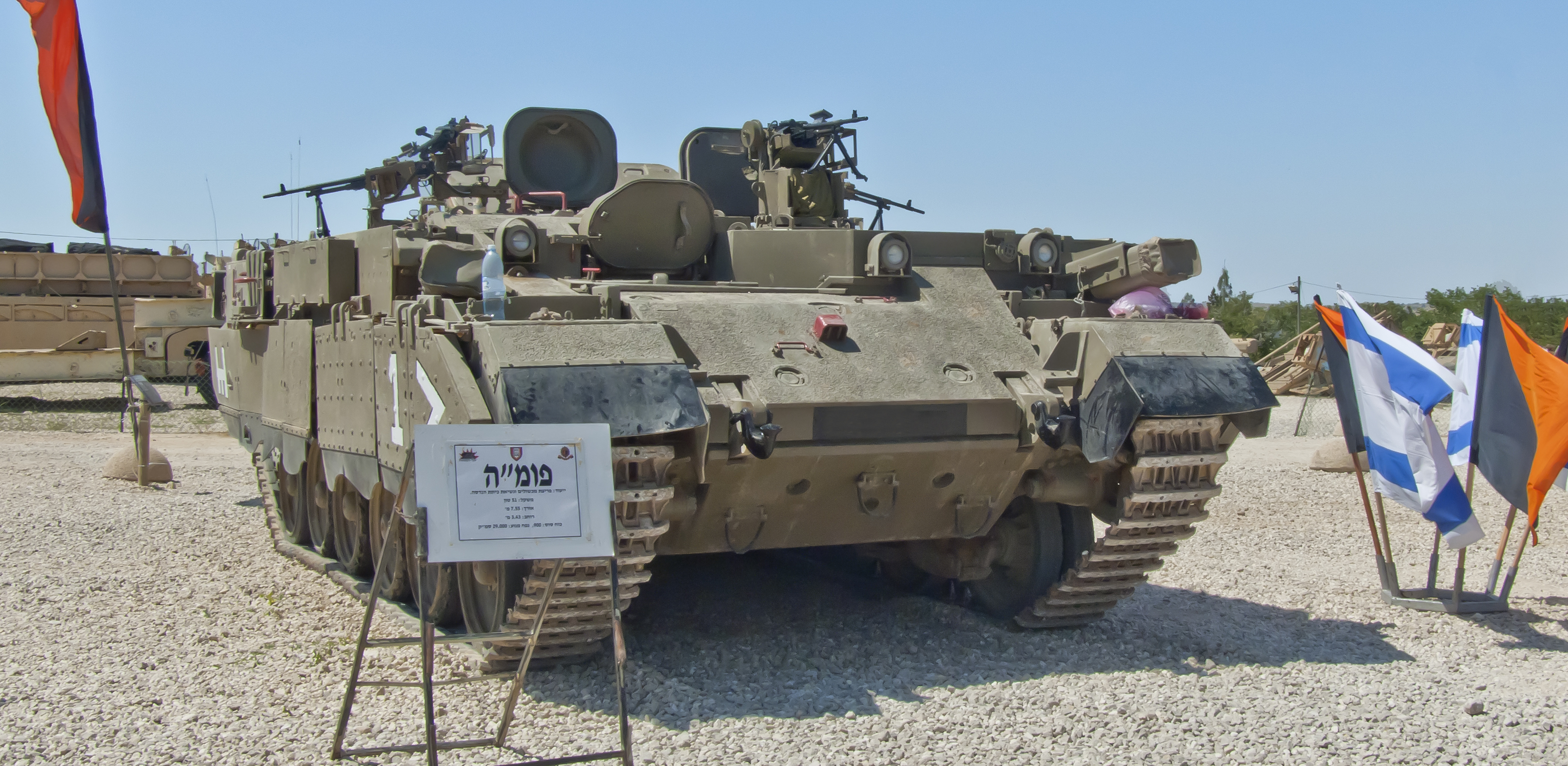
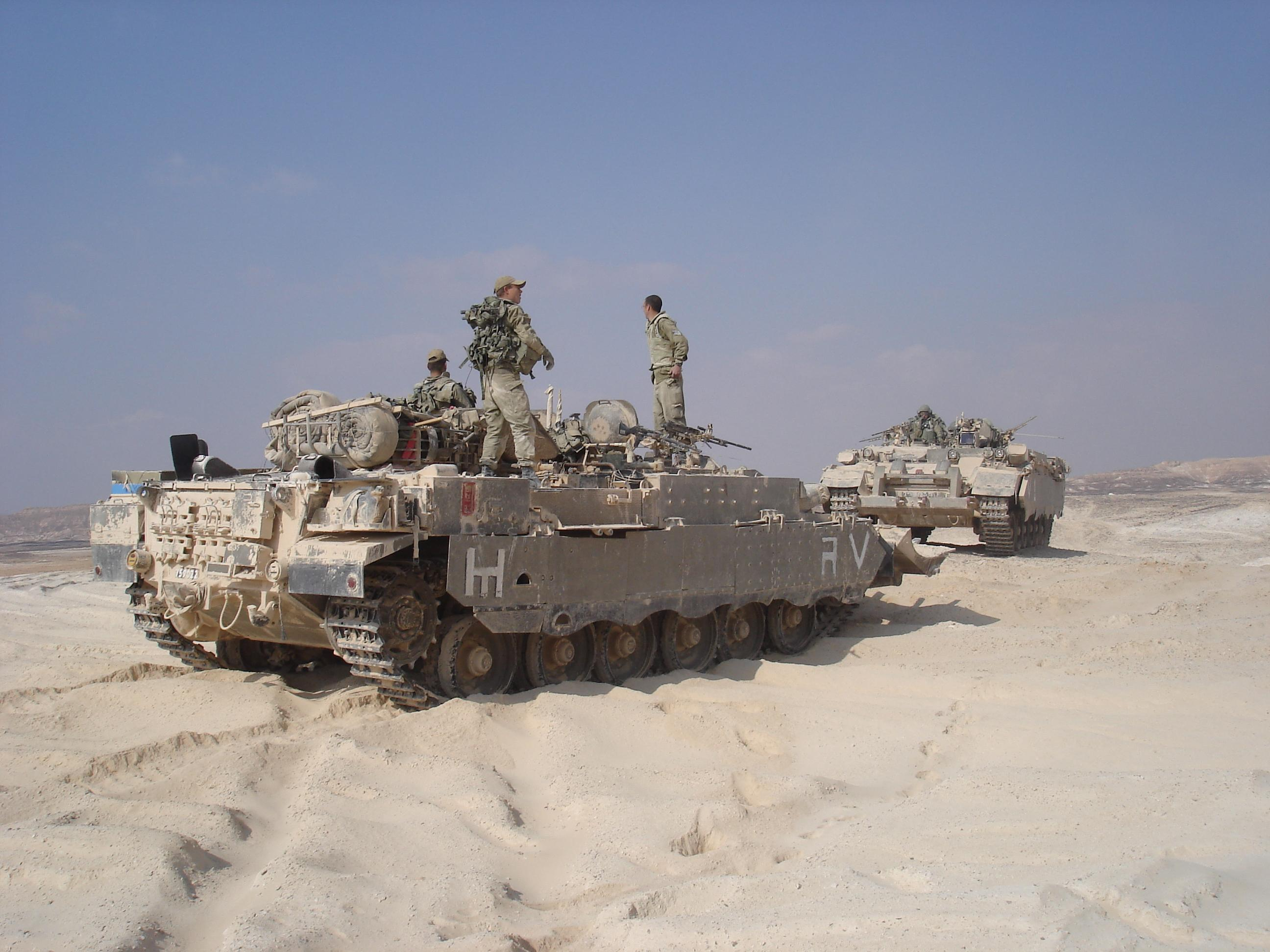
- Top: IDF Puma on display. Bottom: Puma in service with 601st Battalion of the Israeli Engineering Corps.
- Type: Combat engineering vehicle Armoured personnel carrier
- Place of origin: United Kingdom; Israel

Production history
- Designer: Israel Military Industries
- Manufacturer: IDF Ordnance (assembly)

Specifications
- Mass: 50 t
- Length: 7.55 m
- Width: 3.38 m without side skirts
- Height: 2.75 m
- Crew: 10
- Main armament: 3 x 7.62 mm FN MAG; 1x MAG Rafael OWS
- Secondary armament: 1x 60 mm Soltam mortar 2 x TAAS IS-6 smoke grenade launchers with 6 smoke grenades each
- Engine: AVDS-1790-6A; 900 hp at 2,400 rpm
- Suspension: Helical spring
- Maximum speed: 43 km/h cross country

The Puma (Hebrew: פומ"ה פורץ מכשולים הנדסי) is a heavily armored Combat engineering vehicle and armored personnel carrier that the Engineering Corps of the Israeli Defence Forces has used since the early 1990s. The vehicle can carry a crew of up to eight. The 50-ton vehicle's speed is 45 kilometers an hour.

The Puma uses the hull of the Sho't, which is itself a modified British Centurion tank.

Some Pumas are equipped with the Carpet mine-clearing system. This consists of 20 rockets that the crew can fire singly or all together. The rockets contain a fuel-air explosive warhead which spreads a cloud of fuel fumes that are then detonated. The overpressure from the explosion destroys most mines. The Puma then advances behind a set of rollers that trigger any mines the fuel-air explosion did not destroy. There is also electronic equipment for detonating roadside bombs or jamming detonation signals.

The Puma is capable of towing a mobile bridge for deploying over trenches and enemy land obstacles during battle. Unlike the M60 AVLB launching the bridge, the Puma pulls the bridge during combat and pushes the bridge over the obstacle, allowing tanks and infantry personnel carriers to maneuver quickly in the battlefield.

Armament consists of three 7.62 mm FN MAG general-purpose machine guns, including one in a remote turret that the crew can control from within the cabin by a Rafael Overhead Weapon Station (OWS). The vehicle also has a 60 mm mortar and two launchers for smoke grenades.

== Current developments ==
Israel is forming a fourth Combat Engineer Battalion that will specialize in dealing with roadside bombs, mines and booby traps. As part of this effort, Israel will also upgrade its Pumas. The army is adding new equipment for dealing with roadside bombs and is training the crews to cope with the growing numbers of explosive devices encountered in regions such as Gaza.

== See also ==
- VIU-55 Munja – Serbian APC/Combat engineering vehicle based on T-55
