= Nagmachon =

Israeli armoured personnel carrier

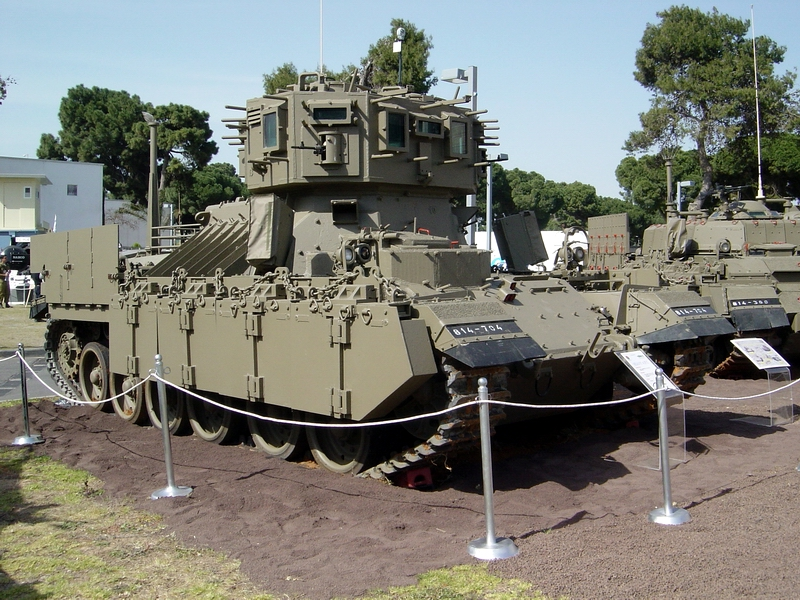
- Nagmachon at LIC 2004 exhibition
- Type: Infantry fighting vehicle
- Place of origin: United Kingdom; Israel

Specifications
- Mass: 52 tonnes (51 long tons; 57 short tons)
- Length: 7.84 metres (25.7 ft)
- Width: 3.38 metres (11.1 ft)
- Crew: 2: driver, commander + 10
- Main armament: 2 x 7.62 mm FN MAG
- Engine: ADVS-1790 –2AC, 750 HP/559,5 kw at 2400 rpm

Nagmachon is a heavily armoured infantry fighting vehicle fielded by the Israel Defense Forces. The Nagmachon evolved from the NagmaSho't armoured personnel carrier (APC), which in turn was based on Centurion tank Sho't hulls from the 1970s and 1980s. The vehicle carries thick belly armour designed to withstand mine-blasts and mountings on the front hull for various engineering devices such as mine plows, mine rollers and bulldozer blades. With its belly armour and the relatively heavy armour of the Centurion hull, the Nagmachon also carries explosive reactive armour to counter high-explosive anti-tank (HEAT) shaped charge rounds, such as rocket propelled grenade (RPG) RPG-7s.

Early Nagmachons were equipped with three armoured shields to give soldiers firing the mounted Fabrique Nationale de Herstal (FN) FN MAG general-purpose machine guns some degree of protection from small arms fire. Later Nagmachons were fitted with a distinctive raised superstructure, sometimes referred to as a 'doghouse'. The raised structure and increased mine protection have made the Nagmachon an ideal platform for counter-insurgency and urban operations, seeing much use in the al-Aqsa Intifada within the disputed territories and southern Lebanon in 2006. It is often used as a military engineering vehicle and a carrier for sappers, although its main role has been to carry infantry.

== See also ==
- Nakpadon – (Israel)
- Puma armored engineering vehicle – (United Kingdom, Israel)
- IDF Achzarit – (Israel)
- Namer – (Israel)
