= Continental AV1790 =

American engine used in armored vehicles

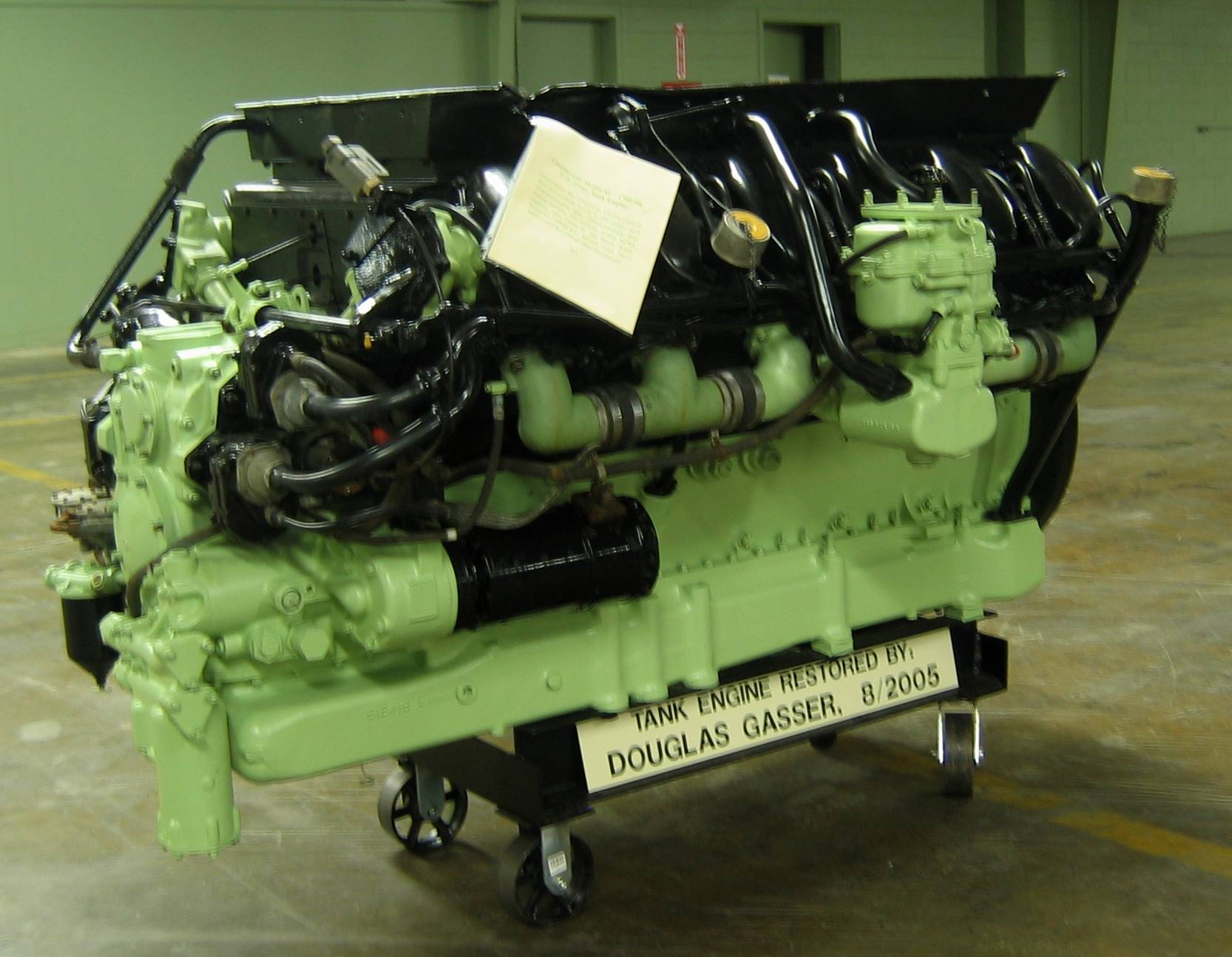
Restored Continental AV1790-5B tank engine at the (now closed) American Armored Foundation Tank Museum in Danville, Virginia

The Continental AV1790 is an American V12 engine used in armored vehicles. Produced by Continental Motors, the AV1790 was used in a variety of limited production and pilot heavy tanks, including the M53 and M55 howitzers, and the T30, T34 and M103 tanks.

The AV1790 was put into service as the power plant for the Patton line of American medium tanks. The M46 Patton, an upgraded M26 Pershing, was the first of these to carry one. This was inherited by the M47 and M48 tanks. While the performance of the engines was satisfactory, the fuel consumption rate became a critical shortcoming as tank weight increased.

As a result there were also diesel versions developed (AVDS, Air Cooled, V-engine configuration, Diesel, Superturbocharged) for the M48A3 and M60 tanks, and the Swedish Stridsvagn 104 (UK-built Centurions, re-engined with diesel engines in the 1980s).

The AV 1790 would continue to be widely used as a power plant in US tracked vehicles and tractors throughout the Cold War, and remains in service across many countries today.

== Engines prefixes ==
The engine prefixes are:

- A-Air cooled
- V-Vee cylinder arrangement
- D-Diesel
- S-Supercharged
- 1790-Displacement in Cubic Inches

== Specifications ==
General characteristics
Type:	90 degree four-stroke V12
Bore:	5.75 in (146.05 mm)
Stroke:	5.75 in (146.05 mm)
Displacement:	1791.7 cu in (29 361 cc)
Cooling:	forced air cooling

=== Gasoline versions ===
	AV-1790-3	AV-1790-5C	AV-1790-7C
Power output (gross)	810 hp at 2800 rpm	810 hp at 2800 rpm	810 hp at 2800 rpm
Power output (net)	704 hp (525 kW) at 2800 rpm	650 hp (485 kW) at 2400 rpm	690 hp (515 kW) at 2800 rpm
Torque (net):	1,440 pound-feet (1,950 N⋅m) at 2200 rpm	1,250 pound-feet (1,690 N⋅m) at 2100 rpm	1,410 pound-feet (1,910 N⋅m) at 2200 rpm
BSFC			
Power-to-weight ratio			
Supercharger	no		
Fuel system	carburetor		
Fuel type	80 octane gasoline (petrol)	80 octane gasoline	80 octane gasoline
Ignition	magneto		
Compression ratio	6.5:1		
Dry weight	2332 lb (1058 kg)	2554 lb (1158 kg)	2647 lb (1200 kg)

=== Diesel versions ===
Designation	Weight, dry	Horsepower, gross	Horsepower, net	Torque, gross	Torque, net	Compression ratio	Induction turbocharged airflow	Fuel type	Fuel consumption (at 2400 RPM)	Use	Note
AVDS-1790-2A	4,700 lb (2,100 kg)	750 hp (560 kW) at 2,400 rpm	643 hp (479 kW) at 2,400 rpm	1,750 lb⋅ft (2,370 N⋅m) at 1,900 rpm	1,575 lb⋅ft (2,135 N⋅m) at 1,750 rpm	16:1	2075 cfm	DF-A, DF-1, DF-2	296 lbs / hour	M60, M60A1, M728, M60 AVLB, retrofitted to M47 & M48	original series
AVDS-1790-2AC	4,700 lb (2,100 kg)	750 hp (560 kW) at 2,400 rpm	643 hp (479 kW) at 2,400 rpm	1,750 lb⋅ft (2,370 N⋅m) at 1,900 rpm	1,575 lb⋅ft (2,135 N⋅m) at 1,750 rpm	16:1	2075 cfm	DF-A, DF-1, DF-2	296 lbs / hour	for Centurion	original series
AVDS-1790-2AR		750 hp (560 kW) at 2,400 rpm	643 hp (479 kW) at 2,400 rpm	1,750 lb⋅ft (2,370 N⋅m) at 1,900 rpm	1,575 lb⋅ft (2,135 N⋅m) at 1,750 rpm	16:1	2075 cfm	DF-A, DF-1, DF-2	296 lbs / hour	M88	original series
AVDS-1790-2C	4,900 pounds (2,200 kg)	750 hp (560 kW) at 2,400 rpm	643 hp (479 kW) at 2,400 rpm	1,750 lb⋅ft (2,370 N⋅m) at 1,900 rpm	1,575 lb⋅ft (2,135 N⋅m) at 1,750 rpm	16:1	2075 cfm	DF-A, DF-1, DF-2	296 lbs / hour	M60A1, M60A3, M60 AVLB	
AVDS-1790-2D	4,880 pounds (2,210 kg)	750 hp (560 kW) at 2,400 rpm	643 hp (479 kW) at 2,400 rpm	1,750 lb⋅ft (2,370 N⋅m) at 1,900 rpm	1,575 lb⋅ft (2,135 N⋅m) at 1,750 rpm	16:1	2075 cfm	DF-A, DF-1, DF-2	296 lbs / hour	M60, M60A1, retrofitted to M48A3 & M48A5	
AVDS-1790-2DR		750 hp (560 kW) at 2,400 rpm	643 hp (479 kW) at 2,400 rpm	1,750 lb⋅ft (2,370 N⋅m) at 1,900 rpm	1,575 lb⋅ft (2,135 N⋅m) at 1,750 rpm	16:1	2075 cfm	DF-A, DF-1, DF-2	296 lbs / hour	M88A1	
AVDS-1790-2CC		750 hp (560 kW) at 2,400 rpm	643 hp (479 kW) at 2,400 rpm	1,750 lb⋅ft (2,370 N⋅m) at 1,900 rpm	1,575 lb⋅ft (2,135 N⋅m) at 1,750 rpm	16:1	2075 cfm	DF-A, DF-1, DF-2	296 lbs / hour	for Centurion	
AVDS-1790-2DC	4,876 pounds (2,212 kg)	750 hp (560 kW) at 2,400 rpm	643 hp (479 kW) at 2,400 rpm	1,750 lb⋅ft (2,370 N⋅m) at 1,900 rpm	1,575 lb⋅ft (2,135 N⋅m) at 1,750 rpm	16:1	2075 cfm	DF-A, DF-1, DF-2	296 lbs / hour	for Centurion	
AVDS-1790-5A	4,900 pounds (2,200 kg)	908 hp (677 kW) at 2,400 rpm	775 hp (578 kW) at 2,400 rpm	2,150 lb⋅ft (2,920 N⋅m) at 2000 rpm		14.5:1	2,200 cfm	DF-A, DF-1, DF-2	380 lbs / hour	Merkava Mk. I, Magach 7	
AVDS-1790-6A		908 hp (677 kW) at 2,400 rpm						DF-A, DF-1, DF-2		Merkava Mk. II, Nakpadon	
AVDS-1790-7A		950 hp (710 kW)						DF-A, DF-1, DF-2		Merkava Mk. II	
AVDS-1790-8A	5,100 pounds (2,300 kg)	1,050 horsepower (780 kW) at 2,400 rpm	892 hp (665 kW) at 2,400 rpm	2,500 lb⋅ft (3,400 N⋅m) at 1,900 rpm			2,450 cfm	DF-A, DF-1, DF-2	430 lbs / hour		
AVDS-1790-8CR		1,050 horsepower (780 kW) at 2,400 rpm						DF-A, DF-1, DF-2		M88A2	
AVDS-1790-9A	5,100 pounds (2,300 kg)	1,200 hp (890 kW) at 2,400 rpm	1,000 hp (750 kW) at 2,400 rpm	2,820 lb⋅ft (3,820 N⋅m) at 1,900 rpm			2,800 cfm	DF-A, DF-1, DF-2	480 lbs / hour		
AVDS-1790-9AR		1,200 hp (890 kW) at 2,400 rpm	1,000 hp (750 kW) at 2,400 rpm	2,820 lb⋅ft (3,820 N⋅m) at 1,900 rpm						Merkava Mk. III	
AVDS-1790 1500	5,000 pounds (2,300 kg)	1,500 hp (1,100 kW) at 2,600 rpm		3,635 lb⋅ft (4,928 N⋅m) at 1,800 rpm				JP-8, DF-A, DF-1, DF-2	570 lbs / hour		

== Sources ==
- Hunnicutt, R. P. Firepower: A History of the American Heavy Tank. Novato, California: Presidio Press, 1988. ISBN 0-89141-304-9
