= List of equipment of the Israel Defense Forces =

Military equipment in service with Israel's military

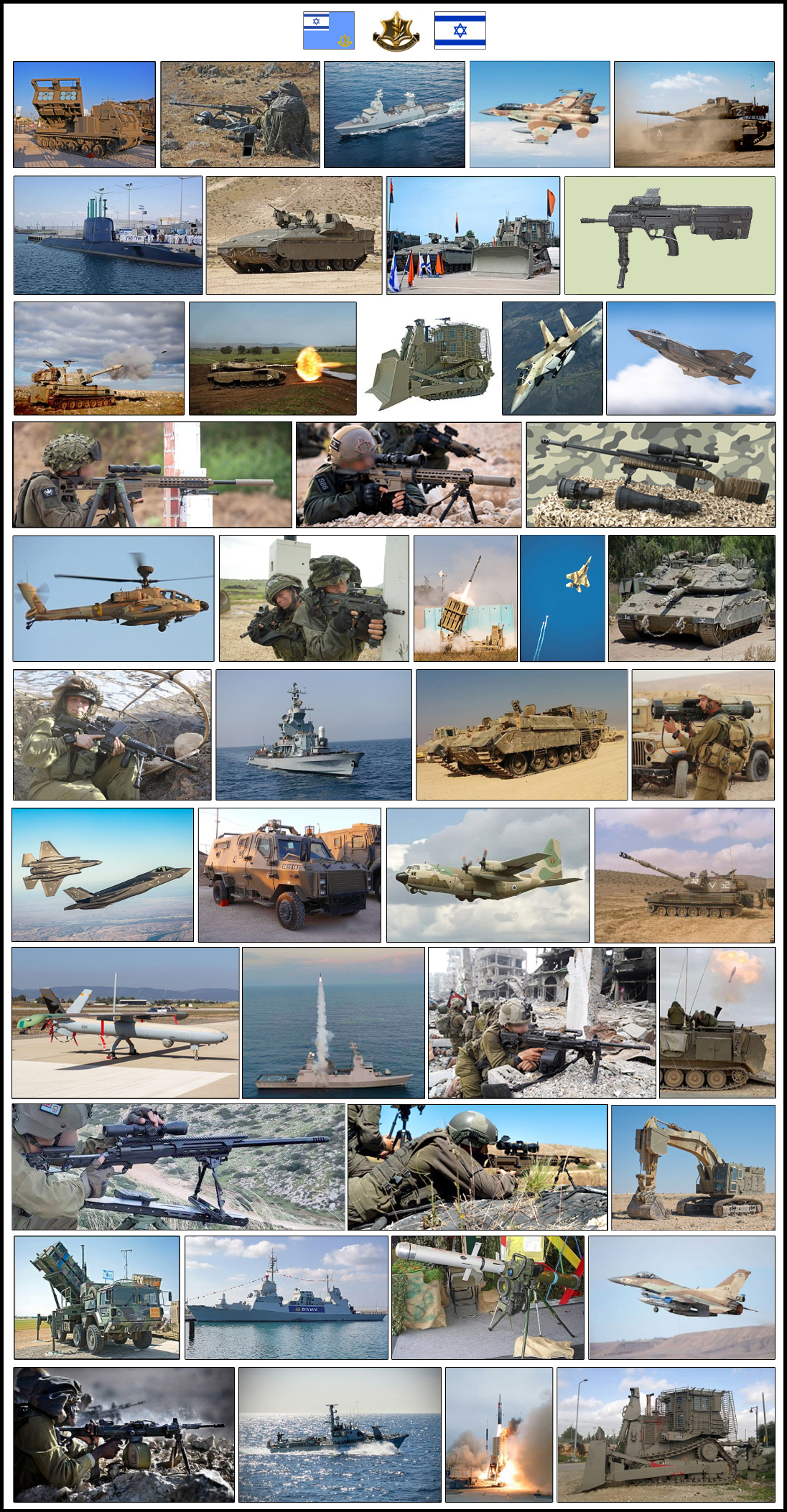
Current equipment and weapons of the Israel Defense Forces, 2021

The military equipment of Israel includes a wide array of arms, armored vehicles, artillery, missiles, planes, helicopters, and warships. Many of these are purchased overseas and many are indigenous designs. Until the Six-Day War of 1967, the Israel Defense Forces' principal supplier was France; since then, it has been the United States government and defense companies in the United States. In the early 21st century, Israeli companies (such as Soltam Systems) began selling arms to the United States. Much military equipment undergoes improvements in Israeli workshops.

In addition to weapons purchased overseas and indigenous products, Israel also operates and maintains large stockpiles of Soviet-made equipment, captured from Arab armies over the course of the Arab–Israeli conflict.

== History ==
During the 1948 Arab–Israeli War, the military equipment in the IDF was very diverse and inconsistent. This was due to the severe limitation in obtaining war materiel (the British Mandate and the Arab embargo). During the 1950s, the IDF began the process of standardization, relying primarily on French military equipment.

During the Six-Day War, the military cooperation with France ceased (the French Weapons Embargo of 1967) and Israel began to rely on American weaponry and on local research and development. During the 1980s and 1990s, the IDF increased its supplies of American arms, armor and aircraft, aiming for technological superiority over Arab countries, toward "a smaller, smarter army".

The reliance on locally manufactured military equipment has also greatly increased. Today, the overwhelming majority of Israel's military equipment is either manufactured in the United States (and often modified in Israeli workshops), or is developed and manufactured locally, with an increasing emphasis on advanced technology, including aerospace and electronics.

== Local military development ==
Some of the military equipment developed locally have been:

- Small arms
  - Dror light machine gun
  - IWI Negev light machine gun
  - Uzi submachine gun
  - Uzi machine pistol
  - Desert Eagle semi-automatic pistol
  - Jericho 941 semi-automatic pistol
  - BUL M-5 semi-automatic pistol
  - BUL Storm semi-automatic pistol
  - SP-21 Barak semi-automatic pistol
  - IMI Galil assault rifle
  - IWI ACE assault rifle
  - IMI Tavor assault rifle
  - IWI Arad assault rifle
  - M89SR sniper rifle
  - Hezi SM-1 semi-automatic PDW
- Anti-tank rockets and missiles
  - MATADOR ATGM
  - B-300 ATGM
  - Shoulder-Launched Multipurpose Assault Weapon
  - Shipon Rocket launcher
  - FGM-172 SRAW ATGM
  - MAPATS ATGM
  - Spike ATGM
  - LAHAT ATGM
  - Nimrod AGM
- Other missiles
  - Guided Advanced Tactical Rocket - Laser
  - Shafrir air-to-air missile
  - Derby air-to-air missile
  - Python air-to-air missile
  - Gabriel naval anti-ship missile
  - ADM-141 TALD decoy missile
  - Popeye AGM-142 air-to-surface missile
  - Delilah cruise missile / anti-radiation missile
  - LORA theater ballistic missile
  - Jericho medium-range ballistic missile
- Aircraft
  - IAI Arava military transport aircraft
  - IAI Sea Scan surveillance aircraft
  - IAI Nesher fighter aircraft
  - IAI Kfir fighter aircraft
  - IAI Namer fighter aircraft
  - IAI Lavi fighter aircraft
  - ATG Javelin jet trainer
- Watercraft
  - Shaldag class fast patrol boat
  - Dabur class patrol boat
  - Dvora class fast patrol boat
  - Super Dvora Mk II class fast patrol boat
  - Super Dvora Mk III class fast patrol boat
  - Sa'ar 3-class missile boat
  - Sa'ar 4-class missile boat
  - Sa'ar 4.5-class missile boat
  - Sa'ar 5-class corvette
  - Gal-class submarine
  - Dolphin-class submarine
- Spaceflight
  - Shavit spaceflight launch vehicle
  - EROS earth observation satellite
  - Ofeq reconnaissance satellite
  - TecSAR reconnaissance satellite
- Weapon stations
  - CornerShot PTU weapon
  - Rafael Overhead Weapon Station
  - Samson Remote Controlled Weapon Station
  - Typhoon Weapon System
- Active protection systems
  - Trophy active protection system
  - Iron Fist active protection system
  - Flight Guard airborne IR countermeasures system
- Radars
  - EL/M-2032 Fire-control radar
  - EL/M-2052 AESA radar
  - EL/M-2075 Phalcon AEW&C radar
  - EL/M-2080 Green Pine target tracking radar
  - EL/M-2083 AEW&C radar
- Optronics
  - ITL MARS reflex sight
  - LITENING targeting pod
  - Spice EO-GPS PGM guidance kit
  - Skystar 300 ISR system
- Tanks
  - M50 Super Sherman medium tank
  - Sho't MBT
  - Magach MBT
  - Sabra MBT
  - Merkava MBT
- Fighting vehicles
  - M113 variants
  - Nimda Shoet APC
  - Trail Blazer ARV
  - IDF Nagmachon APC
  - IDF Nakpadon CEV
  - IDF Puma CEV
  - IDF Achzarit APC
  - IDF Namer IFV
  - Nemmera ARV
  - AIL Abir
  - AIL Storm
  - Plasan Sand Cat
  - Wolf Armoured Vehicle
  - Golan Armored Vehicle
  - AIL M325 Command Car
- Artillery
  - Davidka mortar
  - Soltam M-66 mortar
  - Soltam M-68 howitzer
  - Soltam M-71 howitzer
  - Soltam M-120 mortar
  - L-33/39 Ro'em self-propelled howitzer
  - Makmat self-propelled mortar
  - MAR-240/290 rocket artillery launcher
  - LAR-160 rocket artillery launcher
  - LAROM rocket artillery launcher
  - Cardom mortar
  - Rascal self-propelled howitzer
  - ATMOS 2000 self-propelled howitzer
  - Sholef self-propelled howitzer
  - Pereh missile carrier
- Unmanned aerial vehicles
  - Tadiran Mastiff UAV
  - Casper 250 UAV
  - Silver Arrow Micro-V UAV
  - Silver Arrow Sniper UAV
  - IAI Scout UAV
  - IAI Searcher UAV
  - IAI Harpy UAV
  - IAI Harop UAV
  - IAI Bird-Eye UAV
  - IAI I-View UAV
  - IAI Ranger UAV
  - IAI Heron UAV
  - IAI Eitan UAV
  - IAI Panther UAV
  - IAI Ghost UAV
  - IAI RQ-2 Pioneer UAV
  - IAI RQ-5 Hunter UAV
  - Elbit Skylark UAV
  - Elbit Hermes 90 UAV
  - Elbit Hermes 450 UAV
  - Elbit Hermes 900 UAV
  - Aeronautics Dominator UAV
  - Aeronautics Orbiter UAV
  - Urban Aeronautics X-Hawk UAV
  - MicroFalcon UAV
- Unmanned surface vehicles
  - VIPeR UGCV
  - Protector USV
  - Guardium UGV
  - Raam HaShachar unmanned Caterpillar D9 armored bulldozer
  - Silver Marlin USV
- Air-defense systems
  - Machbet self-propelled anti-aircraft weapon
  - Barak 1 naval surface-to-air missile
  - Barak 8 naval surface-to-air missile
  - Barak MX surface-to-air missile system
  - SPYDER air-defense system
  - Arrow anti-ballistic missile
  - Tactical High Energy Laser
  - Iron Dome short-range rocket defense system
  - David's Sling medium-range rocket defense system
- Miscellaneous
  - Mitznefet helmet camouflage
  - Tomcar all-terrain vehicle
  - MG251/253 smoothbore tank gun
  - Kilshon anti-radiation missile launcher
  - IDF Caterpillar D9 armored bulldozer
  - Skunk riot control agent
  - Scream riot control agent
  - SIMON breach grenade
  - Enhanced Tactical Computer
  - OR-201 Combat helmet

== Ground forces equipment ==
=== Small arms ===
Name	Image	Type	Caliber	Origin	Notes
Pistols
Jericho 941		Semi-automatic pistol	9×19mm	Israel	Used by IDF and IDF Special Forces
Glock 17		Semi-automatic pistol	9×19mm	Austria	Used by IDF Special Forces
Glock 19		Semi-automatic pistol	9×19mm	Austria	Used by IDF Special Forces
Browning Hi-Power		Semi-automatic pistol	9×19mm	Belgium	
SIG Sauer P226		Semi-automatic pistol	9×19mm Parabellum	Switzerland	Used by IDF Special Forces.
Beretta M1951		Semi-automatic pistol	9×19mm	Italy	
Heckler & Koch P11		Underwater pistol	7.62×36mm	Germany	
Submachine guns
IMI Uzi		Submachine gun	9×19mm	Israel	Uzi, Mini-Uzi, Micro-Uzi, and Uzi-Pro used.
Ingram MAC-10		Submachine gun	9×19mm	United States	
IWI X95		Submachine gun and bullpup assault rifle	9×19mm variant	Israel	9x19mm suppressed variant used by IDF Special Forces
Semi-automatic rifle
Suppressed Ruger 10/22		Semi-automatic rifle	.22 LR	United States	Adopted for non-lethal crowd control.
Assault rifles
Tavor X95 (Micro-Tavor Dor Gimel)		Bullpup assault rifle/Carbine/Service rifle	5.56x45mm	Israel	Improved version of the X95 with longer barrel.
IWI X95 (Micro-Tavor)		Bullpup Assault rifle/Carbine	5.56x45mm	Israel	Compact version of the TAR-21. Standard Issue rifle since 2009 replacing the TAR-21.
IWI Tavor TAR-21		Assault rifle	5.56×45mm	Israel	Cut from service as of 2009 and replaced by the X95.
M4A1 Carbine		Carbine/Assault rifle/Service rifle	5.56×45mm	United States	Standard Issue Assault Rifle along with M16, CAR-15, and X95 and used by Special Forces
M16A1		Assault rifle	5.56×45mm	United States	Former standard issue rifle. Most of the long-barreled rifles ("M16 Aroch", lit. "Long M16") were modified to have short barrel and a telescoping stock, the rest are reserved for basic training and ceremonial issues.
M16A2		Assault rifle	5.56×45mm	United States	Current standard Issue Assault Rifle along with the M4, CAR-15, M16A1 and X95. Most of the M16A2 is firing automatic, some to custom for DMR and rest are ceremonial issues.
CAR-15		Assault rifle	5.56×45mm	United States	Commonly known as "M16 Katzar" (lit. "Short M16"). Common types are Colt Model 653 ("Mekutzar"), Colt Commando ("Mekutzrar") or self-modified M16A1 rifles ("Menusar"). Standard Issue Assault Rifle along with M4 and X95
IMI Galil		Assault rifle	5.56×45mm	Israel	Used in limited numbers. Variants used are Galil AR and Galil SAR. Most Galil's have been replaced by the improved (Galil) IWI ACE.
IMI Micro Galil		Assault rifle	5.56×45mm	Israel	Used in limited numbers. Highly compact version of the Galil. Most Galil's have been replaced by the improved (Galil) IWI ACE.
AKM		Assault rifle	7.62×39mm	Soviet Union	Captured from Arab armies over the course of the Arab–Israeli conflict and was used by Special Forces due to their high reliability.
AK-47		Assault rifle	7.62×39mm	Soviet Union	Captured from Arab armies over the course of the Arab–Israeli conflict and was used by Special Forces due to their high reliability.
Battle rifles
M14		Battle rifle	7.62×51mm	United States	Used in limited numbers by the IDF.
Light machine gun
IMI Negev		Light machine gun	5.56×45mm	Israel	Capable of firing semi-automatic or full-auto. The 5.56 variant features a unique dual feed system, it can accept 30 round STANAG magazines and an assault-box belt.
IWI Negev UX		Commando machine gun	7.62×51mm	Israel	A compact ultralight version of the Negev NG7.
Medium machine gun
M1919 Browning		Medium machine gun	.30-06 Springfield	United States	
General-purpose machine guns
FN MAG		General-purpose machine gun	7.62×51mm	Belgium	Former Standard Issue to IDF Since 1960s to 1990s as a Main Machine Gun.
Negev NG7		General-purpose machine gun	7.62×51mm	Israel	Capable of semi-automatic or full-automatic fire.
PKM		General-purpose machine gun	7.62×54mmR	Soviet Union	Captured from Arab armies over the course of the Arab–Israeli conflict and used by Special Forces.
M60		General-purpose machine gun	7.62×51mm NATO	United States	Limited use.
Heavy machine guns
Browning M2 (Makach 0.5)		Heavy machine gun	12.7×99mm	United States	Upgraded to M2HB-QCB
Shotguns
Armsel Striker		Revolving riot shotgun	12 Gauge	South Africa	Used for riot control
Designated marksman rifles
M4A1 Kala Sa'ar		Designated marksman rifle	5.56×45mm	United States	Accurized M4A1, used by "kala sa'ar" marksmen.
SR-25 Mk 11		Designated marksman rifle/Sniper rifle	7.62×51mm	United States	Used by IDF Special Forces. Also employed as a sniper rifle.
Tavor X-95L "Micro-Tavor Kala'im"		Designated marksman rifle	5.56×45mm	Israel	Accurized Micro-Tavor X95 with longer barrel, used by "kala sa'ar" marksmen.
Sniper rifles
M24 SWS		Sniper rifle	7.62×51mm	United States	Standard-issued sniper rifle, achieves accuracy of 0.5 MOA with IMI ammo.
IDF Modernized M24 SWS		Sniper rifle	7.62×51mm	United States	Standard-issued sniper rifle, achieves accuracy of 0.5 MOA with IMI ammo.
Mauser 86SR		Sniper rifle	7.62×51mm	Germany	Used for counter-terrorism operations.
Barak (HTR 2000)		Long-range sniper rifle	.338 Lapua Magnum	United States	An IDF modified H-S Precision Pro Series 2000 HTR rifle
Barrett M82A1		Anti-materiel rifle	12.7×99mm	United States	Used mainly by the Combat Engineering Corps and IDF Special Forces
McMillan TAC-50		Long range sniper rifle/Anti-materiel rifle	12.7×99mm	United States	Used by IDF Special Forces.
Barrett MRAD		Multi-role sniper rifle (field sniping / counter-terrorism / long-range)	7.62×51mm.338 Lapua Magnum	United States	Used by Special Forces and also by Israeli Police elite CT unit YAMAM. Achieves accuracy of 0.35-0.5 MOA (1.1 cm groups in 100 m).
Barrett REC10}		Semi-automatic sniper rifle (counter-terrorism)	7.62×51mm	United States	Use by the IDF special forces and also by Israeli Police. Achieves accuracy of around 0.75 MOA.
IWI Dan		Long-range sniper rifle	.338 Lapua Magnum	Israel	
Hand grenades
M26A2		Fragmentation grenade	n/a	Israel	Based on the American M26 grenade
IDF M48		Stun grenade	n/a	Israel	Based on the American M84 stun grenade

=== Rocket and grenade launchers ===
Name	Image	Type	Caliber	Origin	Notes
B-300 Shipon		Shoulder-launched rocket	96 mm	Israel	
M72 LAW		Shoulder-launched rocket	66 mm	United States	
M141 BDM		Shoulder-launched rocket	83 mm	United States	Single-shot shoulder-launched weapon designed to defeat hardened structures. Based on the SMAW.
MATADOR		Shoulder-launched rocket	90 mm	Israel; Singapore	
M203		Under-barrel grenade launcher	40 mm	United States	Usually mounted under an M16, M4, CAR-15, or X95. Mounted on X95's with longer barrels and large trigger guard instead of the standard pistol grip guard.
M320		Grenade launcher	40 mm	Germany United States	Single-shot under-barrel or stand-alone grenade launcher. First received by the Givati Brigade in 2024.
Mk 19		Automatic grenade launcher	40 mm	United States	
Mk 47 Striker		Automatic grenade launcher	40 mm	United States	

=== Missiles ===
Name	Image	Type	Origin	Notes
Spike		Anti-tank missile	Israel	Used various models of the family, including Gil (Spike-MR) and Gil 2 (Spike-LR II), Spike-ER (I and II) and Tamouz (Spike NLOS).
BGM-71 TOW		Anti-tank missile	United States	
LAHAT		Anti-tank missile	Israel	
MAPATS		Anti-tank missile	Israel	
Nimrod		Long-range anti-tank missile	Israel	

=== Vehicles ===
Name	Image	Type	Number	Origin	Notes
Main battle tanks (400)
Merkava Mark 4M		Main battle tank	~400	Israel	~200 stored.
Merkava Mark IV		Main battle tank	~400	Israel	~200 stored.
Merkava Mark 3		Main battle tank		Israel	~700 stored.
Armoured personnel carriers (1,360)
M113		Armored personnel carrier	500 active 5,000 in storage	United States; Israel	Being phased out, used as remotely-operated loitering munitions and for logistical missions during the Gaza war.
Achzarit		Heavy armored personnel carrier	~100	Israel	Based on the T-54 tank
Nagmachon		Heavy armored personnel carrier	N/A	United Kingdom; Israel	Based on the Centurion tank
Nakpadon		Heavy armored personnel carrier	N/A	United Kingdom; Israel	Based on the Centurion tank
Nakpuma		Heavy combat engineering/Armored personnel carrier	N/A	United Kingdom; Israel	Based on the Centurion tank
Namer		Heavy armored personnel carrier	~290	Israel	531 planned to be in service by 2027. Based on the Merkava chassis.
Eitan		Armored fighting vehicle/Armored personnel carrier	N/A	Israel	Equipped with Iron Fist APS
Utility vehicles
Wolf		Armored vehicle	300	Israel	
AIL Storm		Utility vehicle	700	Israel	
HMMWV		Utility vehicle	2,000+	United States	
JLTV		Utility vehicle	~100	United States	
MDT David		Utility vehicle	400	United Kingdom; Israel	Based on the Land Rover Defender
Plasan Sand Cat		Utility vehicle	N/A	Israel	
Otokar Akrep		Armored vehicle	30	Turkey	
Trucks
AIL Abir		4×4 truck	N/A	Israel	
M35		8×12 truck	N/A	United States	
Unimog 437		Heavy truck	N/A	Germany	
HEMTT		8×8 heavy truck	N/A	United States	
Engineering vehicles
Puma		Heavy combat engineering vehicle	N/A	United Kingdom; Israel	Based on the Centurion tank
Namer CEV		Heavy combat engineering vehicle	N/A	Israel	Based on the Merkava tank
IDF Caterpillar D9		Combat armored bulldozer	175+	United States; Israel	Bulldozer manufactured by Caterpillar Inc., military conversion and armor by Israel.
IDF Caterpillar Excavator 330		Armored tracked excavator	N/A	United States; Israel	Excavators manufactured by Caterpillar Inc., military conversion and armor by Israel.
IDF Caterpillar 966 Wheeled Loader		Armored wheeled loader	N/A	United States; Israel	Loaders manufactured by Caterpillar Inc., military conversion and armor by Israel.
M548 Alfa		Cargo and ammunition carrier	N/A	United States; Israel	Based on the M113
M60 AVLB		Armored bridge layer	N/A	United States	
Nemmera		Armored recovery vehicle	N/A	Israel	Based on the Merkava
M88		Armored recovery vehicle	N/A	United States	
Nagmapop		Command and surveillance vehicle	N/A	United Kingdom; Israel	Based on the Centurion tank
AIL Desert Raider		Dune buggy	N/A	Israel	
VIPeR		Unmanned ground vehicle	N/A	Israel	
Guardium		Unmanned ground vehicle	N/A	Israel	
Dawn Thunder/Black Thunder		Unmanned armored bulldozer	N/A	United States; Israel	Based on the IDF Caterpillar D9N
IDF D9T Panda		Unmanned armored bulldozer	N/A	United States; Israel	Based on the IDF Caterpillar D9

=== Artillery ===
Name	Image	Type	Number in service	Origin	Notes
Self-propelled howitzers
Ro'em		155mm self-propelled howitzer	N/A	Israel	Currently being introduced into service, slated to replace the M109 as the primary howitzer of the IDF.
M109 Doher		155mm self-propelled howitzer	250	United States; Israel	Upgraded as the M109 Doher. Based on the M109A5. Being replaced by the Ro'em as the primary howitzer of the IDF but will remain in reserve. 30 M109A2 in store
M107		175mm self-propelled howitzer		United States	36 in store
M110		203mm self-propelled howitzer		United States	36 in store
Towed howtizers
M-46		155mm howtizer		Soviet Union	40 modernized in store
M-68/M-71		155mm howitzer		Israel	50 in store
M-839P/M845P		155mm howitzer		Israel	81 in store
Mortars
Cardom SP		120 mm self-propelled mortar		Israel	Khanit
Soltam M-65		120 mm mortar		Israel	650 in store
Soltam M-66		160mm mortar		Israel	18 in store
Anti-tank missile launcher
M113 Tamuz		Missile launching vehicle	N/A	Israel	Spike missiles launched from an M113 chassis
Multiple launch rocket system/Ballistic missiles
LAR-160		160 mm MLRS		Israel	50 in store
M270 "Menatetz"		270mm MLRS	30	United States; Israel	18 in store.
PULS		306mm MLRS	N/A	Israel	
Extended Range Artillery Rocket (EXTRA)		Long-range artillery rocket		Israel	150 km range
LORA		Theater quasiballistic missile		Israel	

=== Air defense ===
Name	Image	Type	Number in service	Origin	Notes
MIM-104 Patriot		Surface-to-air missile	N/A	United States	was upgraded to the GM+ "Yahalom" standard
Iron Dome		Air defense missile battery/Anti-rockets missile	9+	Israel	Intercepted hundreds of artillery records since declared operational in 2011.
Iron Beam		Anti-rockets Laser-based system	N/A	Israel	To be issued in late 2025. Smaller adaptation, named Lite Beam, was issued in October 2024.
David's Sling		Medium- to long-range anti-ballistic missile/surface-to-air missile	N/A	Israel	Medium- to long-range anti-ballistic missile with surface-to-air missile capability
Arrow		Anti-ballistic missile	N/A	Israel	Out of the atmosphere anti-ballistic missile missile series

== Air forces equipment ==
Note there are multiple sources and these provide different figures:

Aircraft	Origin	Type	Versions	In Service		
Aircraft	Origin	Type	Versions	_{By INSS}	_{By FlightGlobal}	_{By IISS}
Fighter aircraft
Lockheed Martin F-35 Lightning II	United States	Stealth multirole fighter	F-35I "Adir"	9	39	39
Boeing F-15 Eagle	United States	Air superiority fighter	F-15A "Baz"	$\Bigg\}$ 52	$\Big\}$ 42	8
Boeing F-15 Eagle	United States	Air superiority fighter	F-15C "Baz"	$\Bigg\}$ 52	$\Big\}$ 42	17
Boeing F-15 Eagle	United States	Air superiority fighter	F-15B "Baz"	$\Bigg\}$ 52	$\Big\}$ 16	6
Boeing F-15 Eagle	United States	Air superiority fighter	F-15D "Baz"	$\Bigg\}$ 52	$\Big\}$ 16	19
Boeing F-15E Strike Eagle	United States	Strike fighter	F-15I "Ra'am"	25	25	25
General Dynamics F-16 Fighting Falcon	United States	Multirole fighter	F-16A "Netz"	$\Big\}$ 107	$\Big\}$ 63	77
General Dynamics F-16 Fighting Falcon	United States	Multirole fighter	F-16B "Netz"	$\Big\}$ 107	$\Big\}$ 63	16
General Dynamics F-16 Fighting Falcon	United States	Multirole fighter	F-16C "Barak"	$\Big\}$ 136	77	~50
General Dynamics F-16 Fighting Falcon	United States	Multirole fighter	F-16D "Barak"	$\Big\}$ 136	49	49
General Dynamics F-16 Fighting Falcon	United States	Multirole fighter	F-16I "Sufa"	100	99	97
Trainer aircraft
Grob G-120	Germany	Trainer aircraft	G-120A-1 "Snunit"	27	16	16
Beechcraft T-6 Texan II	United States	Trainer aircraft	T-6A "Efroni"	19	20	20
Alenia Aermacchi M-346 Master	Italy	Transonic jet trainer	M-346i "Lavi"		30	30
Transport/Aerial refueling/Aerial firefighting/Utility/Signals intelligence/Maritime patrol/Airborne early warning (AEW)
Air Tractor AT-802	United States	Aerial firefighting	AT-802F	8	7	3
Beechcraft Bonanza	United States	Utility	A-36 "Khofit"	22	–	22
Beechcraft Super King Air (C-12 Huron)	United States	Utility/Transport/Trainer	B-200/T/CT "Tzofit"	$\Big\}$ 29	$\Big\}$ 22	22
Beechcraft Super King Air (C-12 Huron)	United States	EW / ELINT / SIGINT	RC-12D/K "Kookiya"	$\Big\}$ 29	$\Big\}$ 22	6
IAI SeaScan	Israel	Maritime patrol	1124N "Shahaf"	3	3	3
Gulfstream G550	United States	SEMA	G500 "Nahshon-Shavit"	3	3	3
Gulfstream G550	United States	CAEW	G550 "Nahshon-Eitam"	2	2	2
Lockheed C-130 Hercules	United States	Tactical transport	C-130E "Qarnaf"	$\Big\}$ 12	$\Big\}$ 3	5
Lockheed C-130 Hercules	United States	Tactical transport	C-130H "Qarnaf"	$\Big\}$ 12	$\Big\}$ 3	6
Lockheed C-130 Hercules	United States	Aerial refueling	KC-130H "Qarnaf"	3	7	4
Lockheed Martin C-130J Super Hercules	United States	Tactical transport	C-130J "Shimshon"	-	7	7
Boeing 707	United States	Heavy transport/EW	707 "Re'em"	8	7	3
Boeing 707	United States	Aerial refueling	KC-707 "Saknai"	5	8	6
Helicopters
Boeing AH-64 Apache	United States	Attack helicopter	AH-64A "Peten"	30	26	26
Boeing AH-64 Apache	United States	Attack helicopter	AH-64D "Saraph"	17	22	20
Sikorsky CH-53 Sea Stallion	United States	Heavy transport	CH-53 "Yas'ur 2000"	$\Big\}$ 36	17	$\Big\}$ 24
Sikorsky CH-53 Sea Stallion	United States	Heavy transport	CH-53 "Yas'ur 2025"	$\Big\}$ 36	5	$\Big\}$ 24
Sikorsky S-70 (UH-60 Black Hawk)	United States	Tactical transport	S-70A / UH-60A/L "Yanshuf"	48	49	48
Bell 206 (OH-58 Kiowa)	United States	Light transport/Trainer	206B "Saifan"	–	18	6

=== Unmanned aerial vehicles ===
- (Israel) IAI Heron
- (Israel) IAI Eitan
- (Israel) IAI Harpy
- (Israel) IAI Harop
- (Israel) Elbit Hermes 450
- (Israel) Elbit Skylark

=== Weaponry ===
- (United States) MIM-104 Patriot surface-to-air missile
- (Israel) / (United States) Arrow anti-ballistic missile
- (Israel) PB500A1 laser-guided hard-target penetration bomb
- (Israel) M-85 cluster bomb
- (United States) CBU-58 cluster bomb
- (United States) Mark 84 bomb
- (Israel) MPR500 penetration bomb
- (Israel) Spice glide bomb
- (United States) GBU-39 Small Diameter Bomb
- (Israel) Python air-to-air missile
- (Israel) Popeye air-to-surface missile AKA AGM-142 Have Nap in US use
- (Israel) Popeye Turbo SLCM suspected long range submarine-launched cruise missile, suspected nuclear weapon carrier
- (United States) Joint Direct Attack Munition guided bomb
- (United States) AGM-65 Maverick air-to-surface missile
- (United States) AGM-88 HARM air-to-surface anti-radiation missile
- (United States) AGM-114 Hellfire air-to-surface anti-tank missile
- (United States) AIM-120 AMRAAM air-to-air missile
- (United States) AIM-9 Sidewinder heat seeking air-to-air missile
- (United States) MIM-72 Chaparral surface-to-air missile
- (Israel) Delilah cruise missile
- (Israel) Iron Dome anti-rocket and mortar defense missile
- (Israel) Iron Beam Laser-based air defense system
- (Israel) David's Sling surface-to-air missile
- (Israel) Jericho II intermediate range ballistic missile, suspected nuclear
- (Israel) Jericho III intercontinental ballistic missile, suspected nuclear

== Naval forces equipment ==
Below are the IDF's active service watercraft. The year of service, speed, full load displacement, and crew members, are in parentheses.

=== Missile boats ===
- (Israel) Sa'ar 4 class missile boat (1970s; 32 kn (59 km/h); 450 tons; 45 crew members)
- (Israel) Sa'ar 4.5 class missile boat (1980s; 31 kn (57 km/h); 488 tons; 53 crew members)

=== Corvettes ===
- (Israel) / (United States) Sa'ar 5-class corvette (1990s; 33 kn (61 km/h); 1,227 tons; 64 crew members)
- (Israel) / (Germany) Sa'ar 6-class corvette (2020s; 26 kn (48 km/h); 1,900 tons; 70 crew members)

=== Patrol boats ===
- (Israel) Dabur (1970s; 19 kn (35 km/h); 39 tons; 9 crew members)
- (Israel) Shaldag (1989; ?; 50 kn (93 km/h); 15 crew members)
- (Israel) Super Dvora Mk II (1996; 46 kn (85 km/h); 54 tons; 10 crew members)
- (South Africa) Nachshol (1997; 40 kn (74 km/h); 12 tons; 5 crew members)
- (Israel) Super Dvora Mk III (2004; 47 kn (87 km/h); 54 tons; 10 crew members)

=== Support ships ===
- INS Bat Yam
- INS Bat Galim

=== Unmanned naval vehicles ===
- (Israel) Protector USV

=== Submarines ===
- (Israel) / (Germany) Dolphin I (1992; 11 kn (20 km/h), 20 kn (37 km/h) underwater; 1,640 tons, 1,900 tons underwater; 30 crew members)
- (Israel) / (Germany) Dolphin II (2014; 13 kn (24 km/h), 25 kn (46 km/h) underwater; 2,050 tons, 2,400 tons underwater; 40 crew members)

=== Commando boats ===
- (Israel) Dolphin type underwater craft
- (Israel) Maiale type underwater craft
- (Israel) Snunit boat
- (Israel) Zaharon boat
- (Israel) Moulit boat
- (Israel) Morena rigid-hull inflatable boat

== Remote weapon systems ==
- (Israel) Typhoon Weapon System
- (Israel) Rafael Overhead Weapon Station
- (Israel) Samson Remote Controlled Weapon Station

== Space systems ==
- (Israel) AMOS communications satellite
- (Israel) EROS earth observation satellite
- (Israel) Ofeq reconnaissance satellite
- (Israel) TecSAR reconnaissance satellite
- (Israel) Shavit space launch vehicle

== See also ==
- Defense industry of Israel
- Nuclear weapons of Israel

== Sources ==
- IISS (2020). The Military Balance 2020. Routledge. ISBN 978-0367466398.
