= Mitznefet =

Mitznefet may refer to:

- Priestly turban, Jewish religious head covering
- Mitznefet (Israeli military), helmet covering
