= Rafael Overhead Weapon Station =

Overhead Weapons Station (OWS)
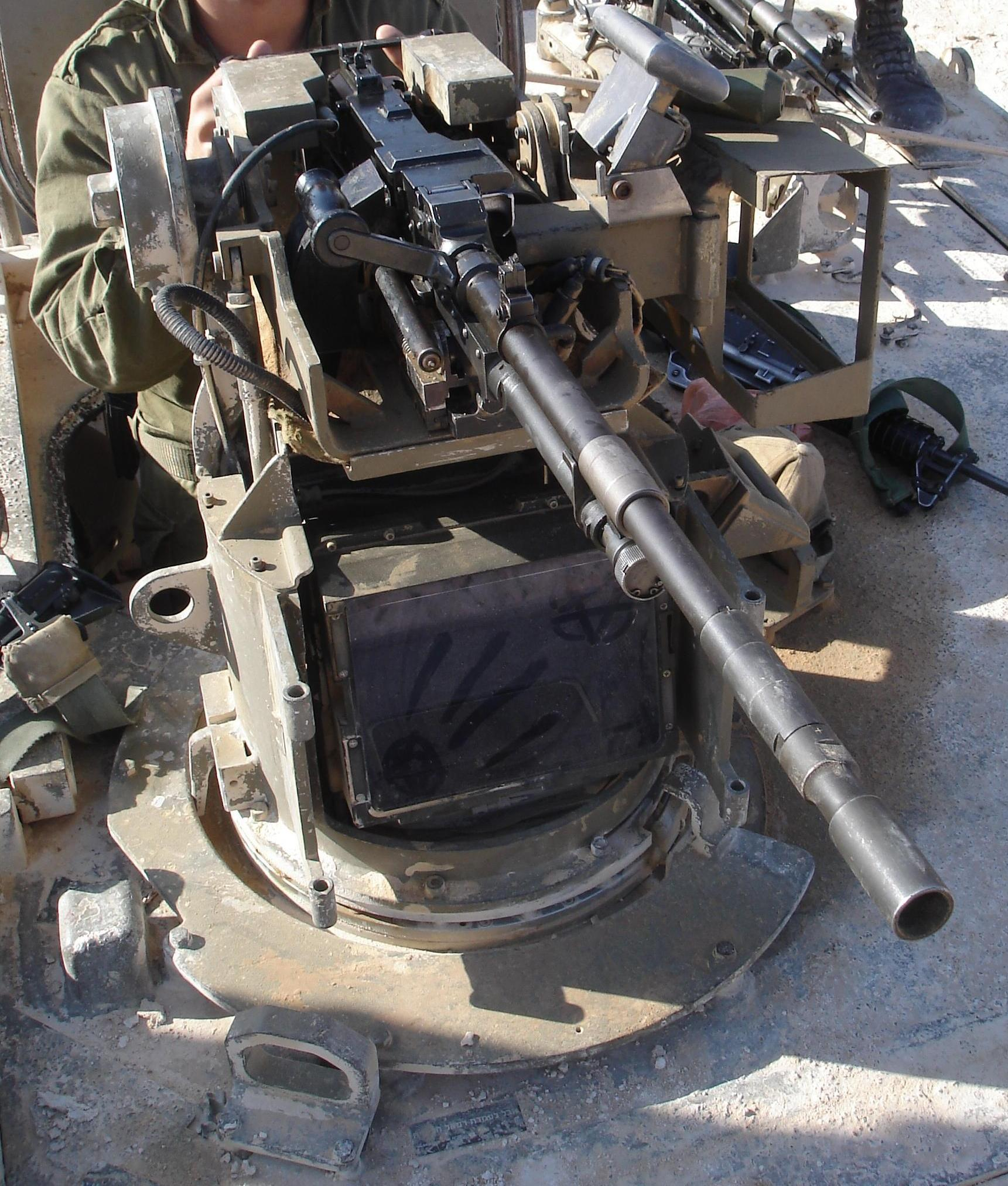
- Type: Remote Weapon System
- Place of origin: Israel

Service history
- Used by: Israel Defense Forces

Production history
- Designer: Rafael Advanced Defense Systems
- Manufacturer: Rafael Advanced Defense Systems
- Variants: OWS-25, OWS-25R

Specifications
- Mass: 200kg (7.62mm model); 140kg (12.7mm model)
- Caliber: 7.62mm, 12.7mm, 25mm
- Elevation: -20 to 60
- Traverse: 360

The Rafael Overhead Weapon Station is a remote weapon station developed by Rafael Advanced Defense Systems in cooperation with the Israel Defense Forces. It has been superseded by the Rafael Samson Remote Controlled Weapon Station (RCWS). However, the larger Rafael OWS-25 and OWS-25R models are still in production.

== Users ==
The OWS is used on:

- IDF Achzarit
- IDF Puma
- M113A2 Ultra OWS
- Otokar Akrep
- Otokar Cobra
- Otokar Yavuz
- Romanian Army MLI-84M

== Variants ==
OWS-25 – carries 25 mm auto cannon, 7.62 mm coaxial machine gun and smoke grenade launchers.

OWS-25R – carries 25 mm auto cannon, 2 anti-tank missiles and 7.62 mm coaxial machine gun. The Rafael OWS-25R adds 1,000 kilograms (2,200 lb) to a vehicle's weight.
