= Helmet cover =

Tactical coverings used by on combat helmets

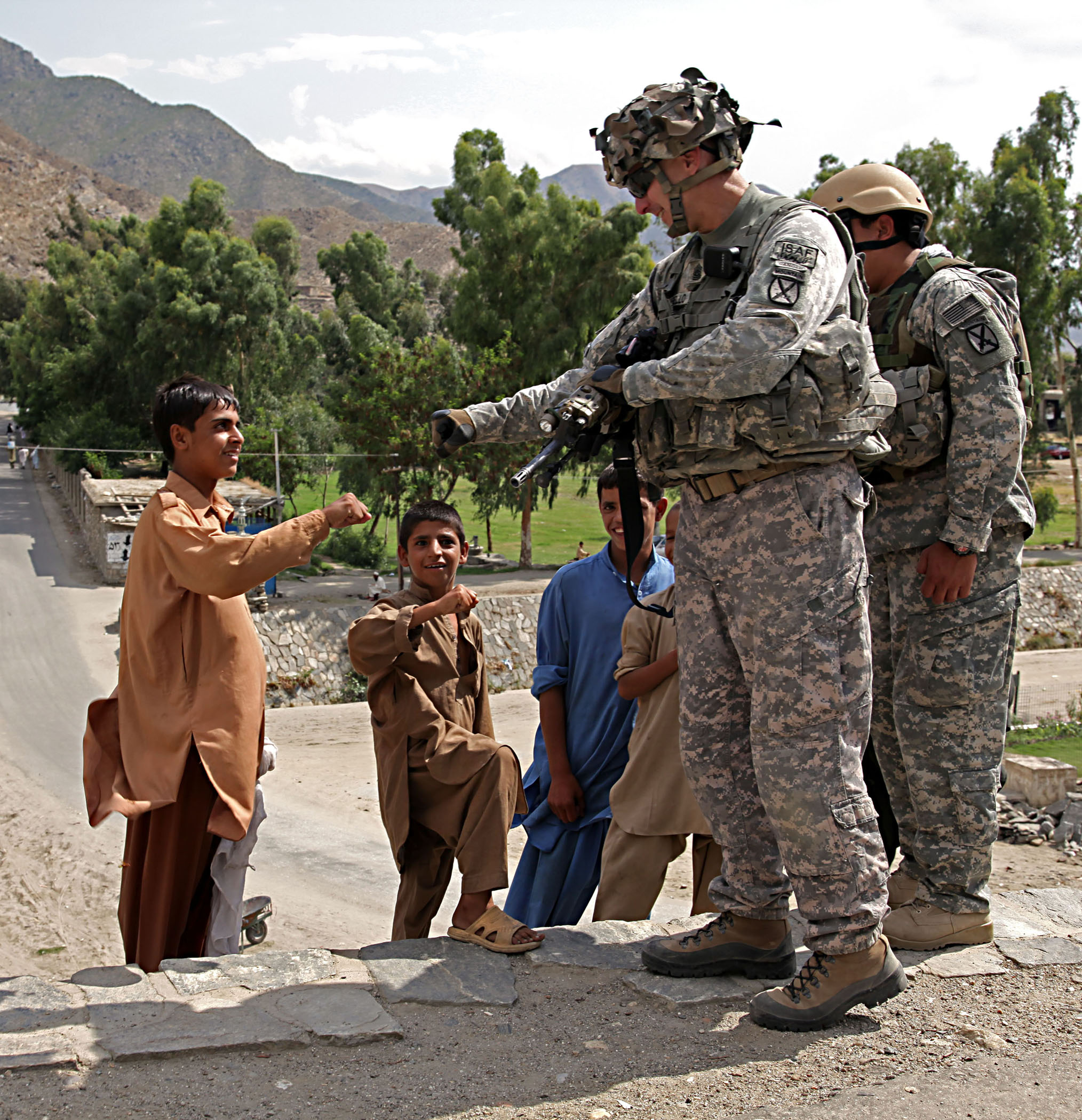
Modern US Army helmet with a camouflage cover (left), bare helmet (right).

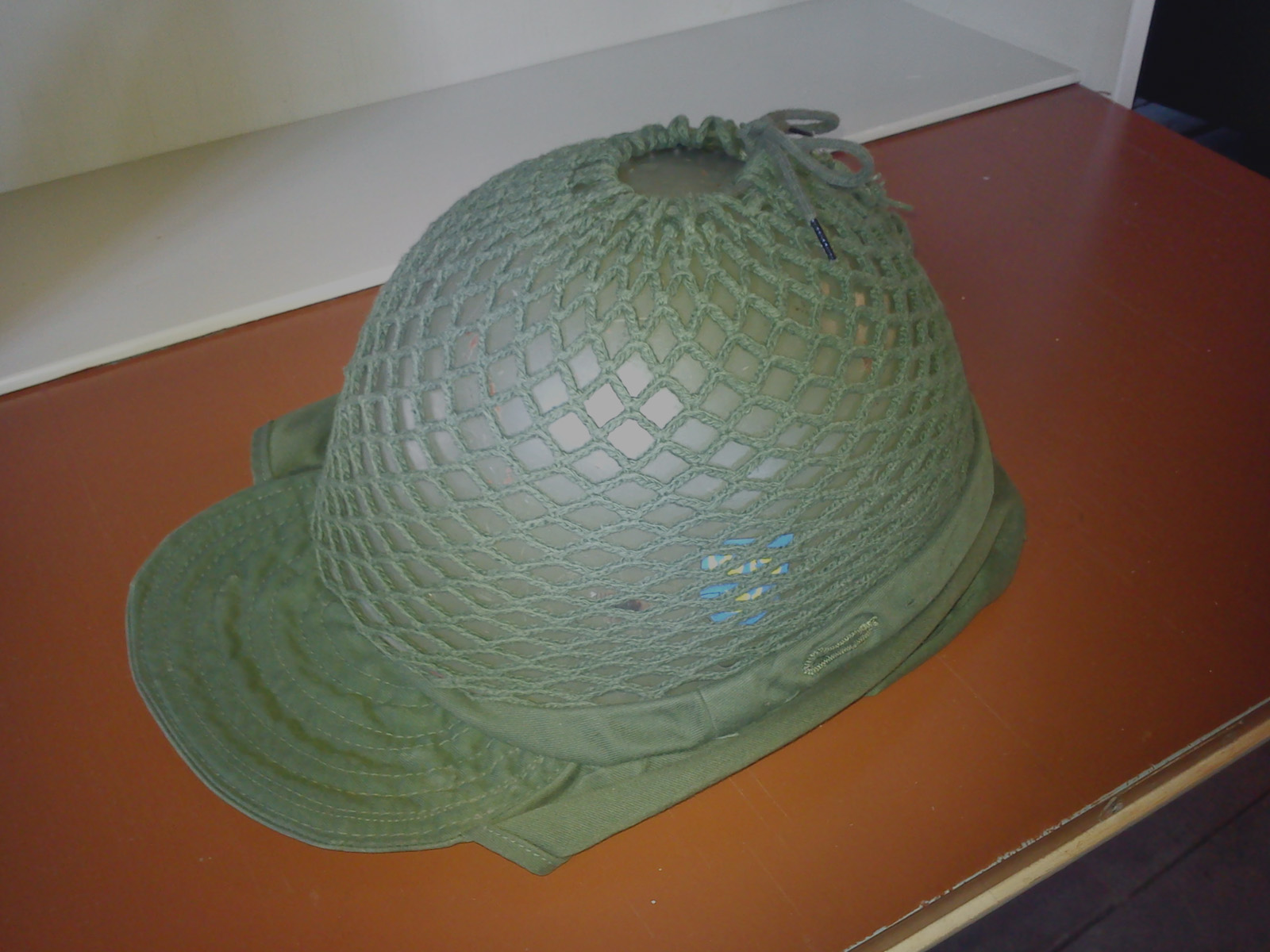
A Swedish m/1937-65 helmet with mesh net cover.

A helmet cover is a fabric covering that fits over a combat helmet. It provides camouflage, protection, and accessory management. It helps conceal the helmet by matching the surrounding environment, reduces glare, protects the helmet from wear and tear, and often includes attachment points for gear such as night vision devices or identification markers.

Helmet covers are usually made out of canvas or cotton and coloured in a camouflage pattern. White covers are sometimes used in snow regions. Helmet covers are generally a flat colour to stop any reflection from a metal helmet. Helmet covers are attached to the helmet in many different ways, such as a tight rubber lip which goes all the way around the helmet rim and is pulled on and peeled off, draw-strings, and types which are attached to the helmet suspension system. The earliest helmet covers were retained simply by being "sandwiched" between the liner and the shell. Helmet covers help break up the helmet's distinctive silhouette and eliminate glare (especially if wet) and can muffle the sound of foliage striking or brushing the helmet.

Both cloth and mesh covers were used by the Wehrmacht in the Second World War.

Helmet covers are used by most armies and are in the camouflage pattern of the country/military's camouflage pattern, but some armies have different covers. For example, the Austrian Armed Forces wear several different helmet covers instead of one standardized cover. The Israeli Defense Forces use the mitznefet, a large, floppy helmet cover to break up the outline of the soldier. The US Army from 1953 to the mid-late 1980s used a dual-sided camouflage cover (one side a green leaf pattern, the other a brown and tan desert pattern) with its steel helmets while the rest of the uniform was green. The US Marine Corps adopted reversible camouflage helmet covers in late 1942. This led to the orders of "green-side out" or "brown-side out." In 1978, the US Army commissioned the design of a textured helmet cover that concealed the shape of head and neck. Shape was disrupted with a soft cover extending down to the shoulders, and the attachment of "disrupter" fringes made by cutting tines of varying lengths from strips of cloth.
