= Elbit Skylark =

Hand-held reconnaissance drone

Skylark I/II
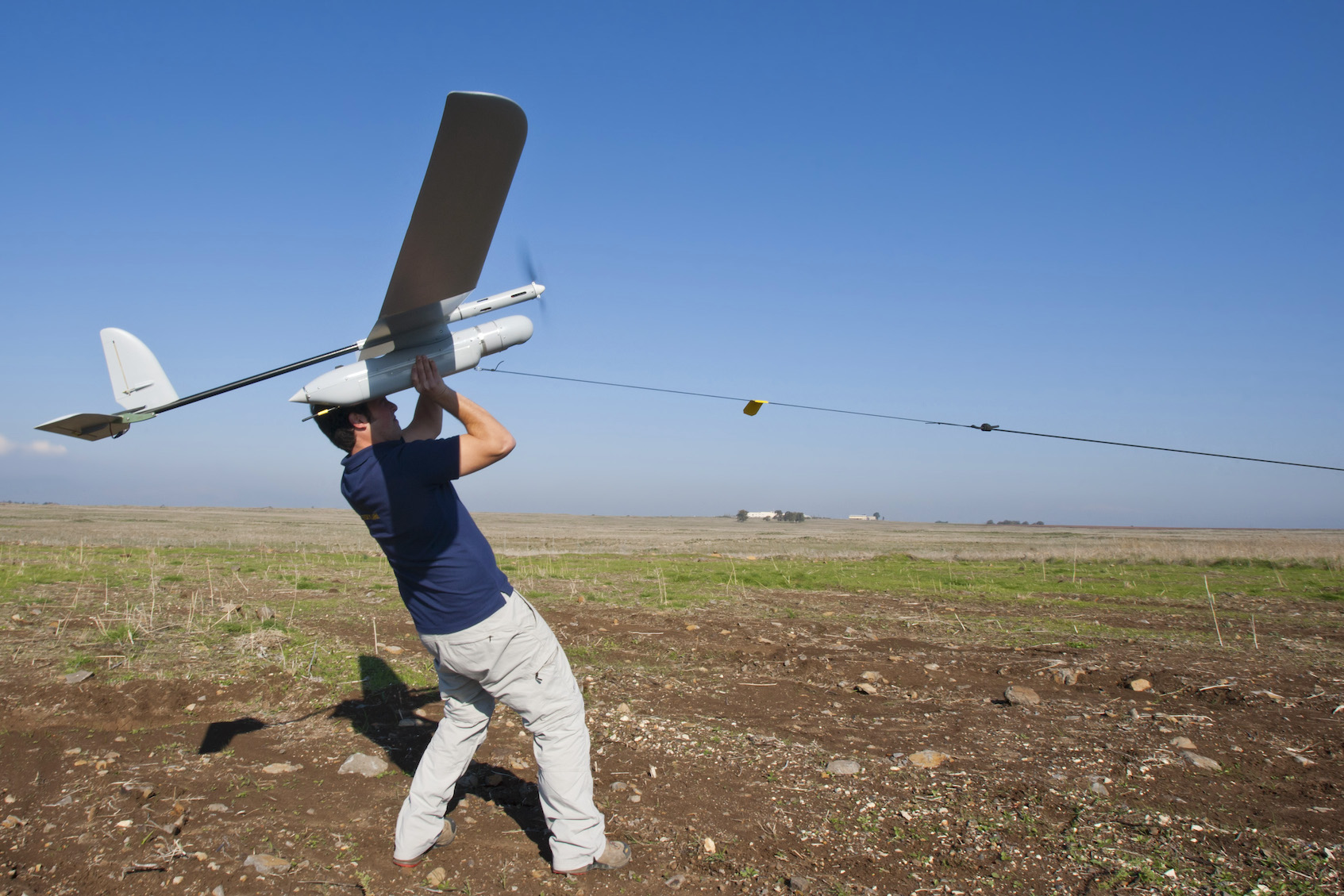
- Skylark I Launched

General information
- Type: Miniature UAV
- National origin: Israel
- Manufacturer: Elbit Systems
- Primary user: Israel Defense Forces

History
- Introduction date: 2008

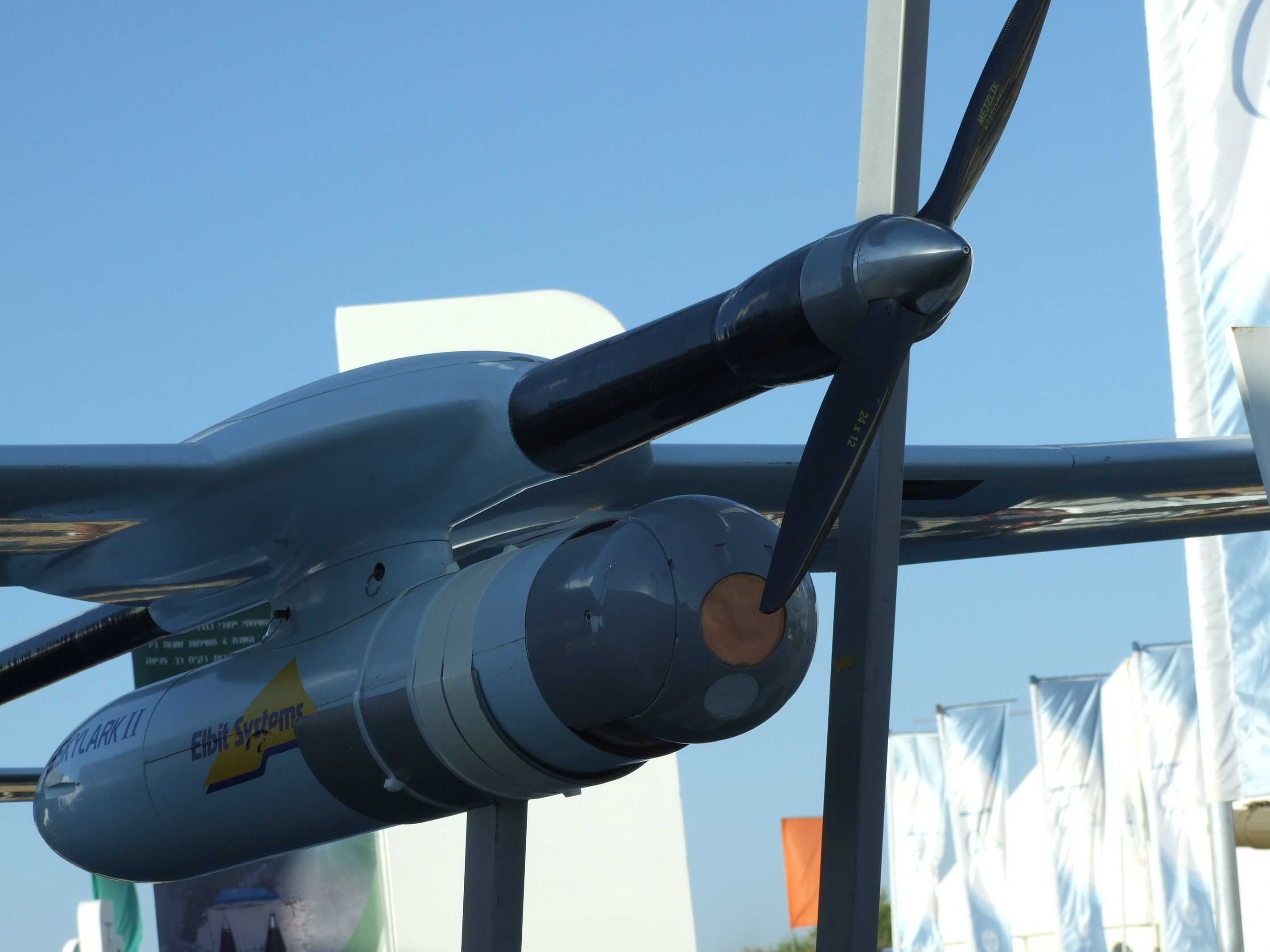
Skylark 2 closeup

The Elbit Systems Skylark I and Skylark II are miniature UAVs developed by Elbit Systems. Initial models of the Skylark entered service in 2008. A larger variant, Skylark III was subsequently developed.

== Design and development ==
=== Skylark I ===
The Skylark I is a Miniature UAV. It is designed as a manpacked system for tactical surveillance and reconnaissance. The Skylark is launched by hand. The payload consists of a daylight CCD or optional FLIR for night operations. During operation, it sends real-time video to a portable ground station. Recovery involves a deep stall maneuver, landing on a small inflatable cushion. It has a range of 20/40 km.

The Skylark is in operation with the armed forces of Croatia, Czech Republic, Hungary, Israel, Macedonia, Myanmar, Netherlands, Poland, Slovakia, and Sweden. It has been deployed in Afghanistan and Iraq. The Skylark I has also been selected by France's special forces (Commando Parachutiste de l'Air n° 10) in March 2008. Previous operators who have now retired the system include Australia and Canada. In total, it has been selected by more than 20 operators worldwide.

=== Skylark II ===
The Skylark II was unveiled in 2006. It has a range of 60 km and is designed to be operated by a two-person crew and to be deployed using HMMWV-class field vehicles. In December 2007, South Korea decided to purchase the Skylark II system. Israel planned to bring the Skylark II into service by mid-2013.

=== Skylark 3 ===
In February 2016, Elbit Systems unveiled the Skylark 3 unmanned air system, revealing it had already gained selection by an undisclosed customer. The Skylark 3 is intended to support brigade and division-level units, having a 4.8 m (15.7 ft) wingspan and a maximum take-off weight of 45 kg (99 lb) with a 10 kg (22 lb) payload. It is deployed from a pneumatic launcher on the ground or mounted on a vehicle, with an operating range of more than 54 nmi (62 mi; 100 km), a service ceiling of 15,000 ft (4,600 m), and flight endurance of up to 6 hours. Two air vehicles can be operated simultaneously using a shared ground control station.

== Operational history ==
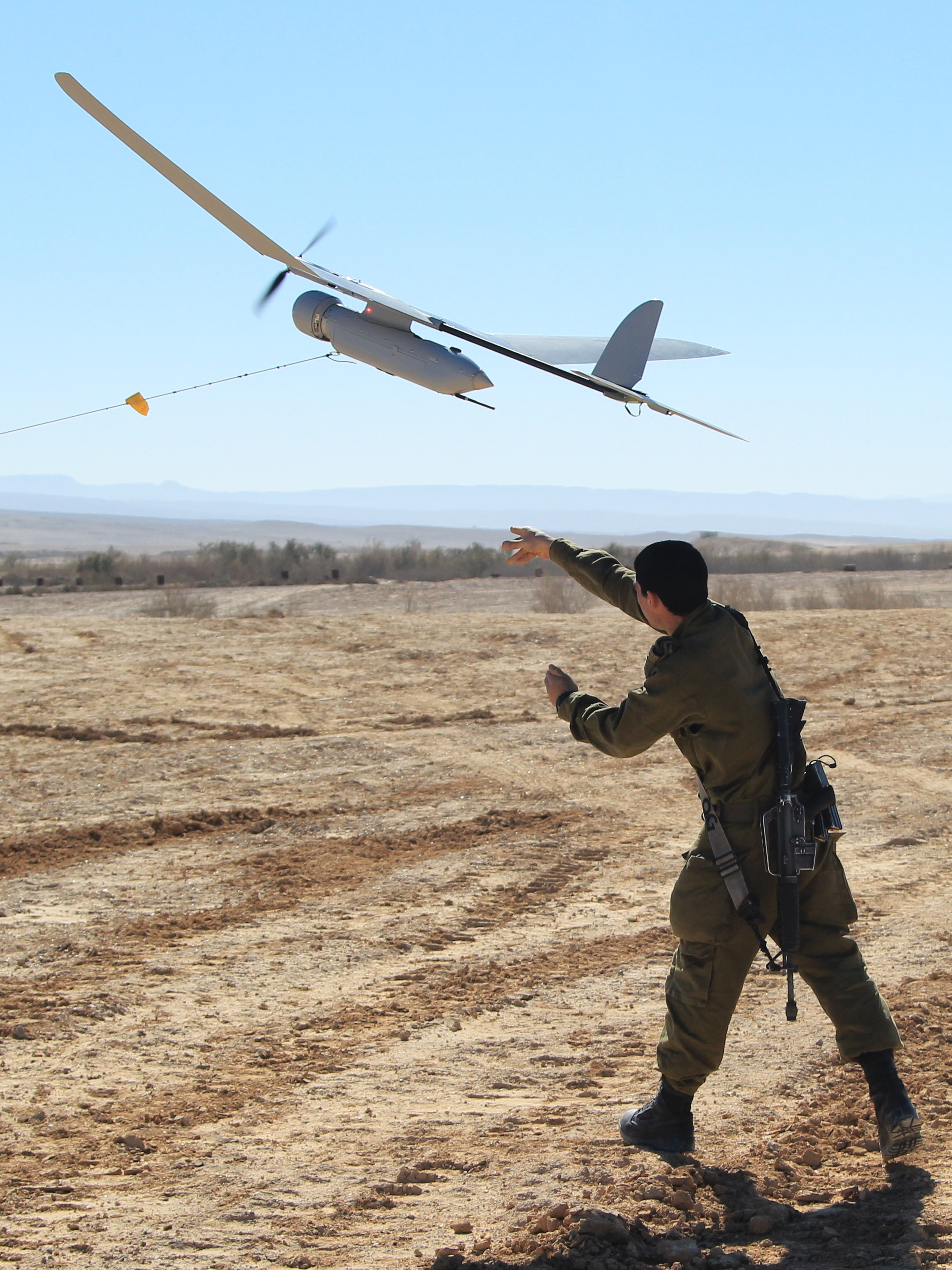
Launching a Skylark, Negev, 2013

The Skylark entered operational service in 2008, and began being used in large quantities for high-tempo support of ground forces during Operation Protective Edge which began on 8 July 2014. Every active and reserve brigade received at least two air vehicles and flew them continuously, sometimes both vehicles at the same time. By August 12, some 18 systems had flown several hundred hours, generating intelligence and streaming target-acquisition data to soldiers on the ground.

On 21 December 2014, Syrian sources claimed a Skylark UAV crashed in Quneitra Governorate during a reconnaissance mission; however, the Israel Defense Forces (IDF) said that they had no knowledge of an UAV in that area at the time. It was not clear if the UAV had crashed or was shot down but photos of the drone were released later.

On 12 August 2015, Al-Qassam Brigades of Hamas claimed that they had captured a Skylark I and reused it for their own missions. The drone was captured on 22 July 2015 by one of their special commando units, and technically checked to make sure it was not booby-trapped.

On 20 March 2017, the Syrian Defense Ministry claimed a Skylark had been shot down and captured on the outskirts of Quneitra. The drone went down due to human error by the troops who were flying it, IDF officials said.

During the 2023 Gaza war, Hamas and Palestinian Islamic Jihad, reportedly captured at least two Skylark drones.

== Operators ==
=== Current operators ===
- Azerbaijan
- Czech Republic
- France
- Georgia
- Honduras
- Hungary
- Israel
- Macedonia
- Mexico
- Myanmar: One Skylark I-LEX UAV of Myanmar Army captured by rebels in early 2020.
- Netherlands
- Philippines
- Poland
- Serbia
- Slovakia
- South Korea
- Sweden
- Turkmenistan
- Uruguay

=== Former operators ===
- Australia Systems now retired and replaced by AeroVironment Wasp III
- Canada Systems now retired and replaced by AeroVironment RQ-11 Raven

== Specifications ==
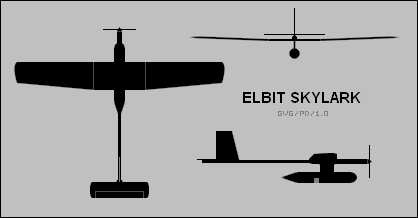
Three-view diagram.

=== Skylark I ===
Man Packed Hand Launched Over the Hill Mini UAV

- Type: Mini Unmanned Aerial System
- Length: 2.2 m (7 ft 3 in)
- Wingspan: 2.4 m (7.9 ft)
- Take-off Weight: 5.5 kg (12 lb)
- Service Ceiling: 4,900 m (16,000 ft)
- Speed: 37 to 74 km/h; 23 to 46 mph (20 to 40 kn)
- Mission radius: 5 to 10 km (3.1 to 6.2 mi)
- Endurance: 2 hours

=== Skylark I-LEX ===
Skylark I-LEX is a new generation, man-portable, electric-propelled, mini unmanned aerial system (UAS).

- Type: Mini Unmanned Aerial System
- Take-off Weight: 7.5 kg (17 lb)
- Payload Weight: 1.2 kg (2.6 lb)
- Service Ceiling: 4,600 m (15,000 ft)
- Range: 40 km (25 mi)
- Endurance: 3 hours

=== Skylark C ===
Skylark C is a shipborne mini UAS designed for patrol boats and small vessel operations.

- Type: Mini UAS For Tactical Naval and Maritime Applications
- Take-off Weight: 15 kg (33 lb)
- Service Ceiling: 4,600 m (15,000 ft)
- Range: 40 km (25 mi)
- Endurance: 5 hours

=== Skylark II UAV ===
The Skylark II is a close-range tactical unmanned aerial vehicle (UAV) system.

- Type: Unmanned Aerial Vehicle
- Wingspan: 5 m (16 ft)
- Maximum take-off weight: 43 kg (95 lb)
- Maximum payload weight: 10 kg (22 lb)
- Powerplant: 1 × 4 kW (5 hp) electrical motor
- Maximum endurance: 6 hours
- Service ceiling: 4,572 m
- Maximum altitude: 16,000 ft
- Maximum range: 50 km (31 mi)

=== Skylark 3 ===
Skylark 3 is a tactical mini UAV system (UAS) optimized for both dismounted and vehicle-based operation

- Type: Unmanned Aerial Vehicle
- Wingspan: 4.7 m (15 ft)
- Maximum take-off weight: 40 kg (88 lb)
- Maximum endurance: 5 hours
- Maximum altitude: 4,600 m (15,000 ft)
- Maximum range: 100 km (62 mi)

=== Skylark 3 Hybrid ===
Skylark 3 Hybrid is a Long Endurance Tactical Mini UAS

- Type: Unmanned Aerial Vehicle
- Wingspan: 4.7 m (15 ft)
- Maximum take-off weight: 48 kg (106 lb)
- Maximum endurance: 18 hours
- Maximum altitude: 3,700 m (12,000 ft)
- Maximum range: 120 km (75 mi)
- Propulsion: hybrid propulsion system, electric and internal combustion

== See also ==
- MicroFalcon
