= VIPeR =

Israeli military robots

VIPeR is a military robot developed by the Israeli company Elbit Systems bases on the technology and with cooperation of Galileo Mobilty Ltd. and intended for use in warfare. It was unveiled in March, 2007.

== Testing ==
At the Modern Day Marine Conference in Quantico, VA, Elbit Systems of America showcased the capabilities of the VIPeR Robot on the Ground Robotics Obstacle Course. This course was specifically designed to push the limits and demonstrate the field capabilities of various robots in simulated battle conditions. The course comprised various terrains, including deep sand, small gravel, areas strewn with brush and debris, and speed bumps. Each participating robot was required to navigate these diverse surfaces, in addition to climbing stairs and maneuvering through a tunnel. Out of the eight robots tested, the VIPeR stood out as one of the most efficient.

== Features ==
The VIPeR robot, designed for enhanced mobility in challenging environments, employs a unique pair of wheel/track systems known as the Galileo Wheel system. This technology was invented by Avishay Novoplanski, and patented by Galileo Mobility Instrument of Israel, allows the wheels to change shape to adapt to various terrains. Additionally, VIPeR features a tail for balance, enabling it to climb stairs and recover from overturns. This capability makes it highly versatile in urban settings, capable of navigating stairs, rubble, dark alleys, caves, and narrow tunnels. As a result, VIPeR serves as a valuable asset for dismounted soldiers by detecting IEDs, booby traps, and alerting them to potential threats.

A notable aspect of VIPeR is its compact design, allowing it to be portable and easily carried by a single person in a backpack along with all necessary gear. Elbit Systems, the manufacturer, has engineered the VIPeR to be lightweight, weighing approximately 11 kg.

VIPeR's small signature enable it to be equipped with various weapons and tools. It is remotely operated through a control harness and a helmet-mounted display. The robot's optional payloads include Pan & Tilt (P&T) cameras, Forward Looking Infrared (FLIR), day/night observation cameras with zoom capabilities, an explosives sniffer, a disrupter, a 9 mm mini-Uzi with a scope and pointer, a grenade releaser, a 4-foot robotic arm, a gripper, and technology for in-building mapping, among other features.

The current operational plan for VIPeR includes deployment with special forces and regular infantry units in high-risk scenarios, such as exploring caves and tunnels, where the safety of human soldiers is a primary concern. Unlike autonomous robots, VIPeR is controlled remotely, relying on human guidance for its operations.
