= Innocon MicroFalcon =

MicroFalcon is a small miniature UAV produced by Innocon in Israel.

The MicroFalcon typically operates at altitudes of 500–2000 feet, and speeds of 20–40 knots. It uses a lightweight, compact sensor package, similar to that used by the Elbit Skylark.

MicroFalcon weighs 6–10 kg and has 2–3 hour endurance. The Peruvian Army has bought the MicroFalcon. In 2017, an Indian law enforcement agency placed an order for the Israeli produced UAV.
