= Casper 250 =

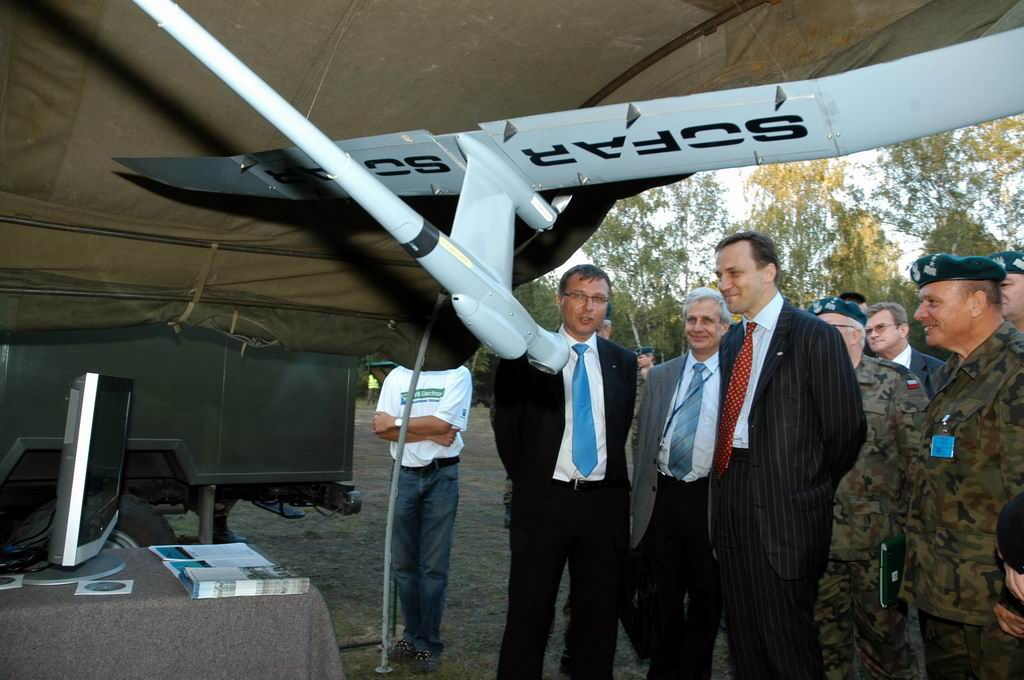

General information
- Type: Unmanned aerial vehicle
- National origin: Poland; Israel
- Manufacturer: WB Electronics
- Designer: WB Electronics; Top-I-Vision

The Casper 250/SOFAR is a civilian-developed "backpack" unmanned air vehicle made in co-operation by Top I Vision Ltd and WB Electronics Sp. z o.o. The aircraft is produced by both companies on the same rights: WB Electronics produces it in Poland as WB Electronics SOFAR and Top I Vision in Israel as Casper 250. It is designed as a reconnaissance platform with real-time data acquisition. The Casper 250 system consists of the aircraft, its payload, ground controlling system and data-link components.

The Casper 250 was designed for quick deployment and simple human-machine interface.

== History ==
The Casper 250/SOFAR was created as a joint venture between the two companies. Top I Vision manufactures it under the name Casper 250. Both companies have the same rights to the documentation, copyright and production.

== Design ==
The device is made entirely of composites and is powered by an electric motor. Due to its small size, the device can be launched manually, or a portable launcher using a stretched rubber band can be used. SOFAR can perform its missions fully autonomously using an autopilot after programming the route, or it can be manually controlled by an operator located in the ground flight control station. Landing can also be performed in automatic and manual mode. The reconnaissance equipment includes interchangeable observation heads that allow the device to operate both day and night. The head with a 3CCD daylight camera with a resolution of 600 thousand pixels, optical zoom x 15, an infrared camera with an image resolution of 324 x 256 pixels and digital zoom x 2 or a digital camera with a resolution of 3 to 5 million pixels.

== Applications ==
Typical military missions include:

- battlefield surveillance;
- target acquisition and designation;
- battlefield monitoring;
- air strike control;
- border patrol;
- coast guard surveillance;
- damage assessment.

The Casper 250 system can also be used for civil or commercial application such as:

- pollution control at ground sea and air;
- natural disasters monitoring;
- forest fire monitoring and control;
- fishery and navigation control;
- general installations security;
- gas pipelines and oil rigs security.

== Capabilities ==
The aircraft possesses the following characteristics and capabilities:

- Electric propulsion, providing for quiet, covert operation;
- Hand launched, self-recovery, man-deployable;
- GPS navigation allows for fully autonomous missions;
- Service ceiling: 2000 feet;
- Operational Endurance 1.5 hours;
- Line of Sight data-link range > 10 km;
- Real-time IMINT (imagery intelligence);
- Payload Control.

== Users ==
- Hungary – at least delivered 2 sets of 6 drones.
