= Achzarit =

Israeli armoured personnel carrier

IDF Achzarit Mk 2
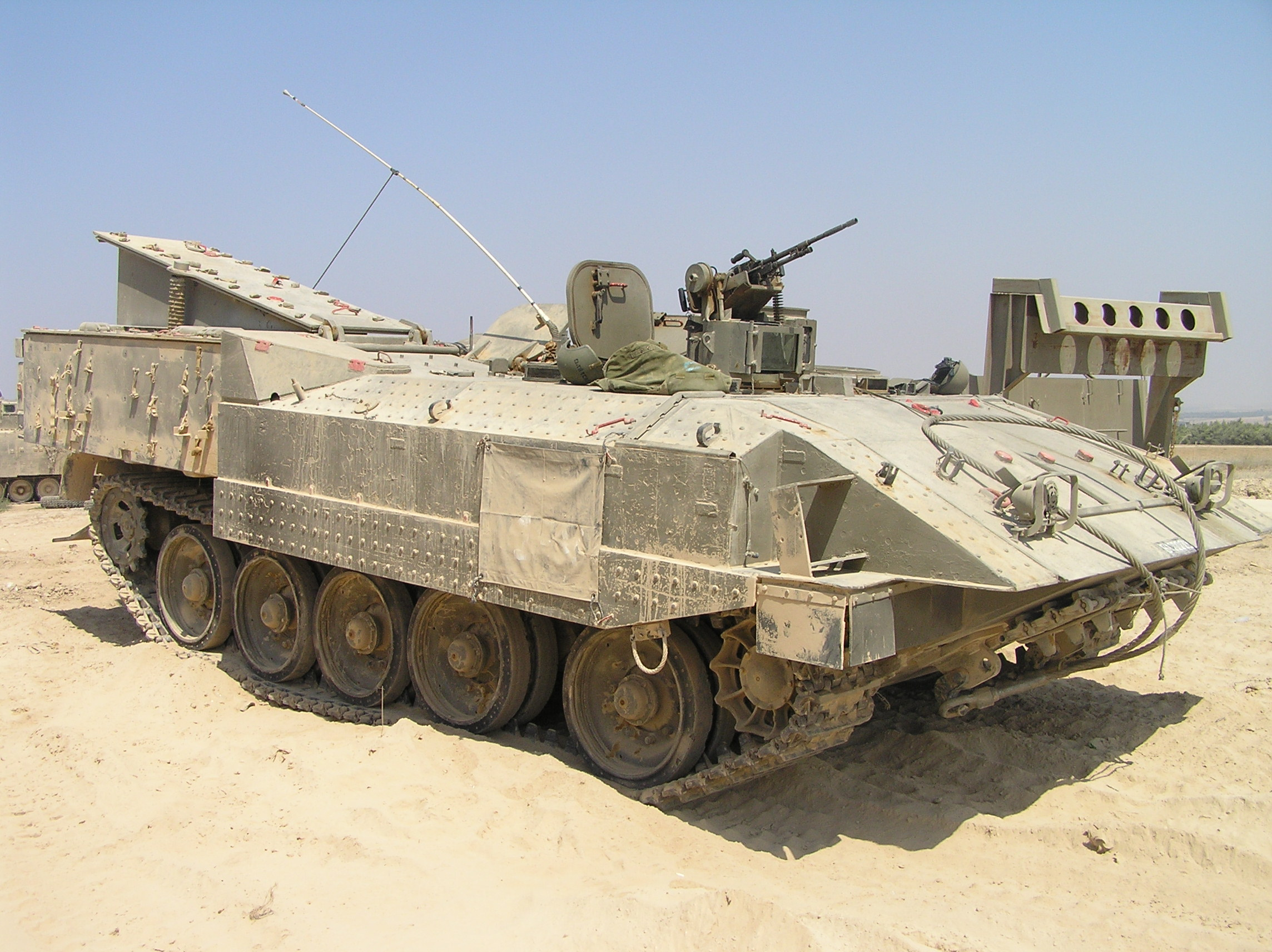
- Achzarit armed with an OWS station
- Type: Armoured personnel carrier
- Place of origin: Soviet Union; Israel

Service history
- Wars: South Lebanon conflict (1985–2000); Second Intifada; 2006 Lebanon War; Gaza War; Israeli invasion of the Gaza Strip (2023–present)

Production history
- Designer: Israeli Defence Forces Corps of Ordnance
- Manufacturer: NIMDA
- Produced: 1988–present

Specifications
- Mass: 44 tonnes
- Length: 6.20 m
- Width: 3.60 m
- Height: >2 m (estimate)
- Crew: 3 + 7 passengers
- Armor: composite
- Main armament: Rafael OWS fitted with a 7.62 mm FN MAG
- Secondary armament: 2×7.62 mm FN MAG
- Engine: Achzarit 1 : Detroit Diesel 8V-71 TTA; Achzarit 2 : 8V-92TA/DDC III; Achzarit 1 : 650 hp (478 kW); Achzarit 2 : 850 hp (625 kW)
- Power/weight: 14 hp/tonne or 19.3 hp/tonne
- Transmission: Achzarit 1 : Allison XTG-411-4; Achzarit 2 : XTG-411-5A
- Suspension: Kinetics modified torsion-bar
- Operational range: 600 km
- Maximum speed: 65 km/h (Achzarit 2)

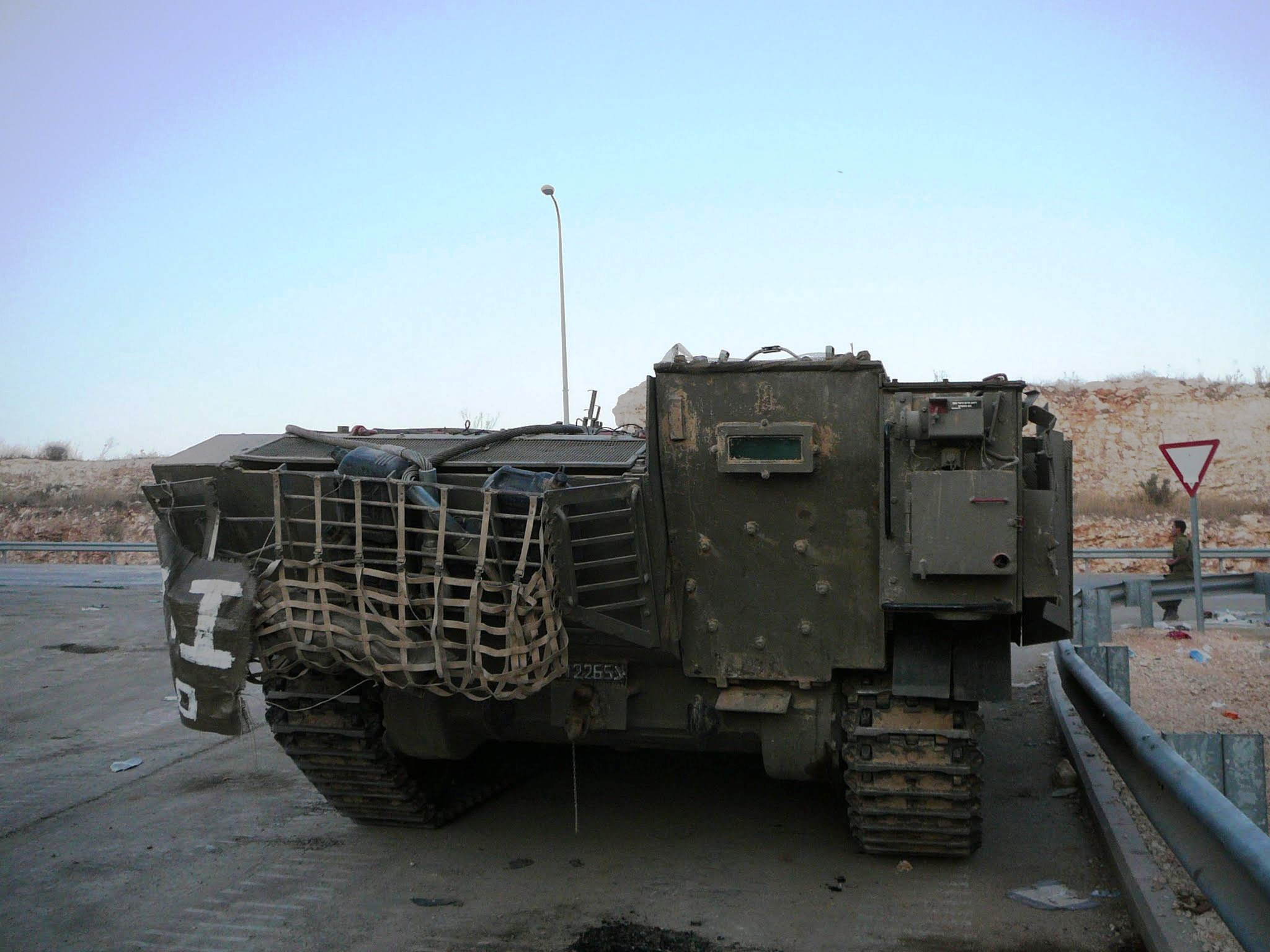
Rear view of an Achzarit

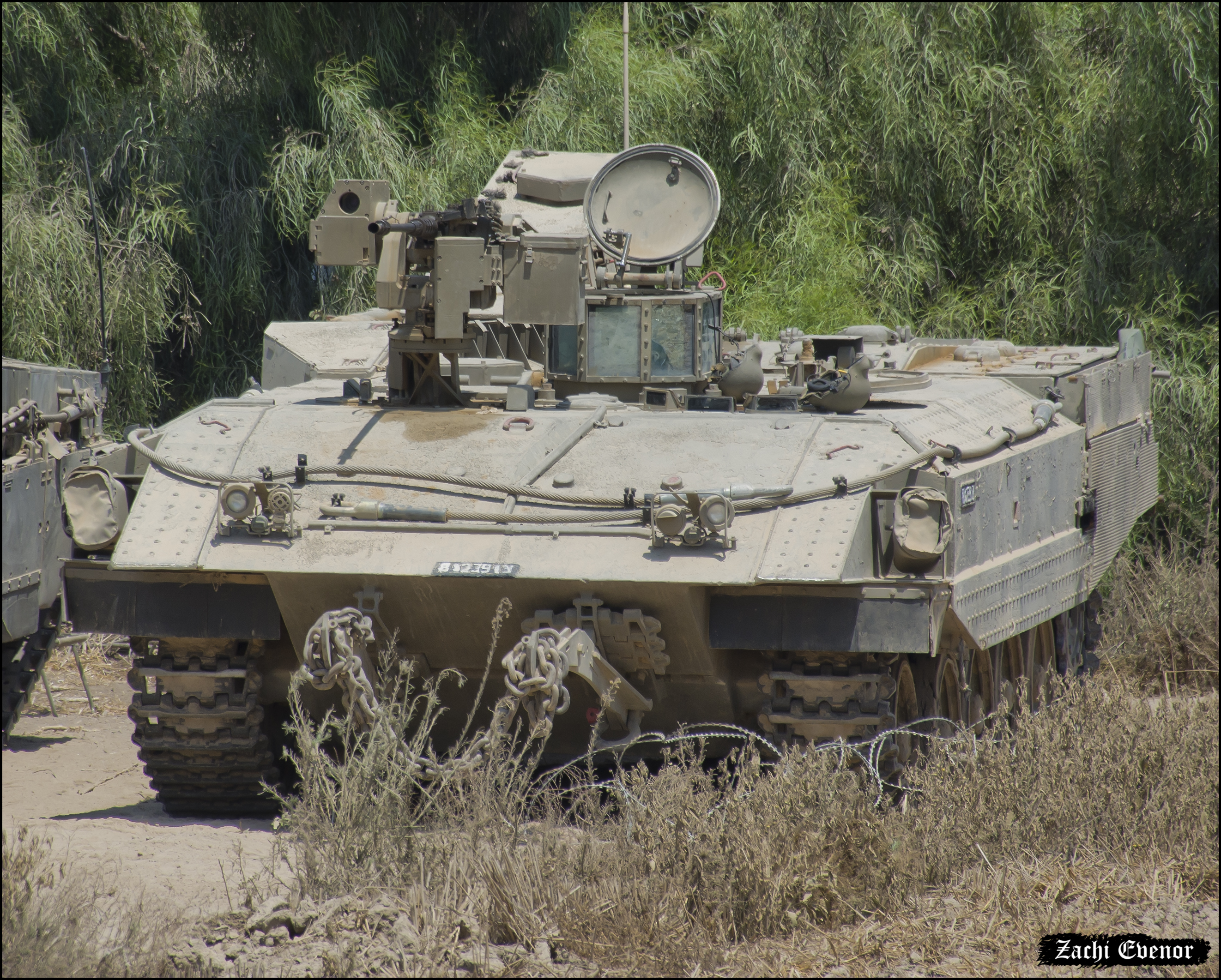
Achzarit Mk 2, upgraded version of the Achzarit for low intensity conflicts, 2016.

The Achzarit (אכזרית in Hebrew: "cruel", feminine inflection) is a heavily armoured personnel carrier manufactured by the Israeli Defence Forces Corps of Ordnance.

== History ==
The Achzarit is based on the Soviet-built T-54/T-55 tank, beginning with those captured from Arab armies during the Arab–Israeli wars. To make space for a troop compartment, the eight-and-a-half tonnes turret, the original superstructure of the chassis and the transversely mounted engine were removed. Non-Explosive Reactive Armour was installed over the original hull. The first model of the Achzarit entered in service in 1988.

== Design ==
=== Protection ===
The Achzarit can withstand both shaped-charges and armor-piercing projectiles which would destroy conventional IFVs. The manufacturers claim that the machine can withstand repeated 125 mm APFSDS hits over its frontal arc. At 44 tonnes, the machine is exceptionally heavy for an infantry carrier. The fact that 14 tonnes of the vehicle's weight is made up of additional advanced special composite armor, gives some indication as to its high degree of protection.

=== Weapons ===
It is armed with three 7.62 mm machine guns, including one Rafael Overhead Weapons Station, a machine gun controlled from within the cabin, developed by Rafael Advanced Defense Systems. As a lesson from the Second Intifada, a ballistic glass turret was installed over one of the hatches to enable the commander to see outside without being exposed to small arms fire and shrapnel.

Several Achzarit in service have been upgraded with a 12.7 mm Samson Remote Controlled Weapon Station in place of the standard 7.62 mm Rafael Overhead Weapon Station.

A version with RCWS-30 was also built.

== Operations ==
Because of its heavy armor, the Achzarit is sometimes called a Heavy APC (HAPC).

Achzarit APCs took part in Operation Rainbow in Rafah, after a comparatively lightly armored M113 APC was destroyed by an RPG. Achzarit APCs were also involved in the Gaza War (2008–09).

On October 7, 2023, several old Achzarit APCs were in Nahal Oz when it was overrun by Hamas.

== Gallery ==
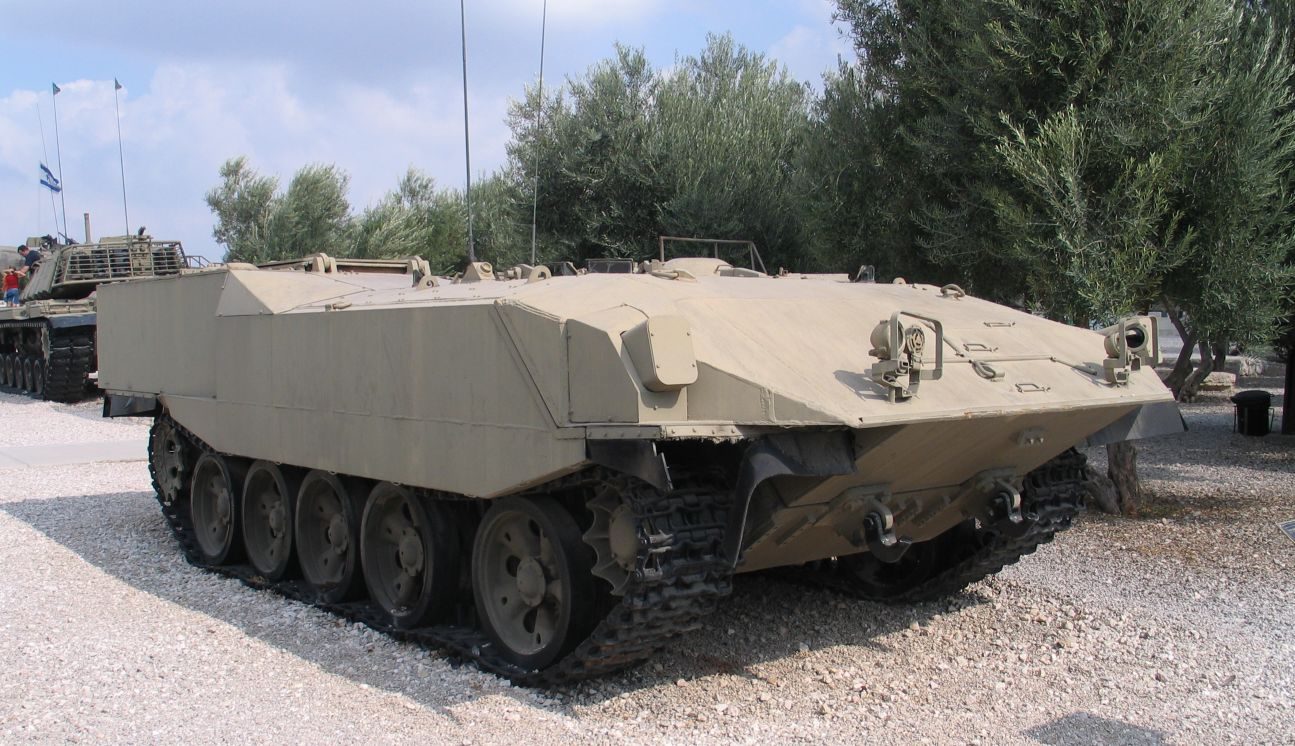

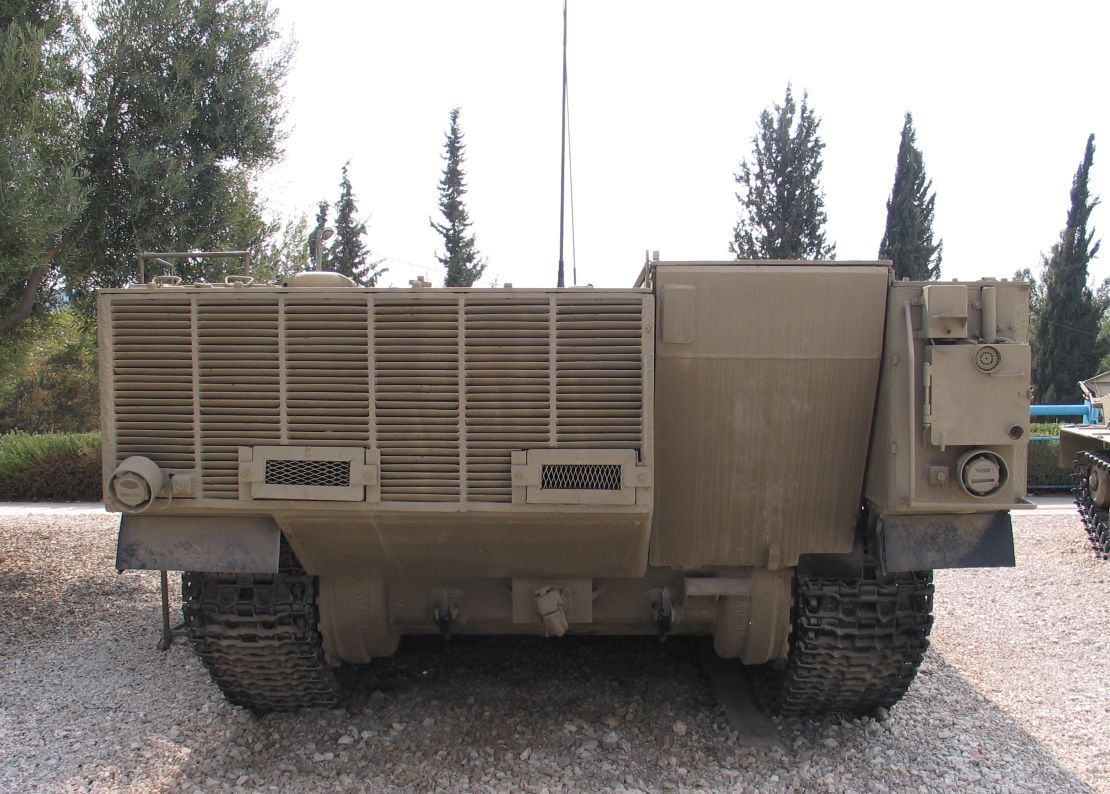

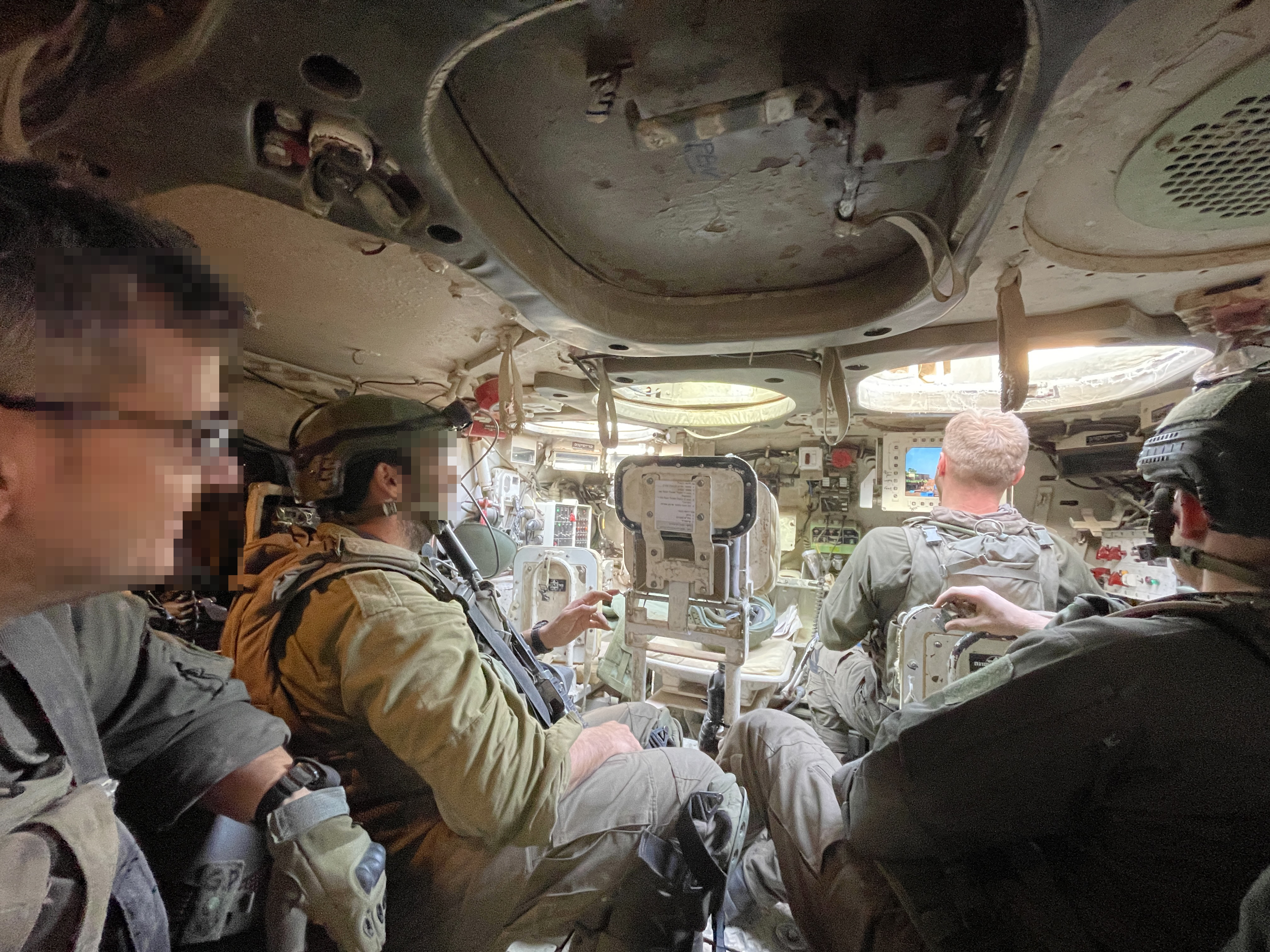
interior of Achzarit in 2023

== See also ==
- VIU-55 Munja, similar example from Serbia
- BTR-T, similar example from Russia
- BMPT Terminator, a Russian tank-derived AFV designed to fight infantry rather than transport it
- BMPV-64 ru:БМПВ-64/uk:БМПВ-64: A Ukrainian heavy infantry combat vehicle based on the T-64 chassis
- Kangaroo (armoured personnel carrier), a series of Allied World War 2 armoured personnel carriers that were based on converted tanks.
