= Enhanced Tactical Computer =

Defense computer

The Enhanced Tactical Computer or ETC is a portable rugged computer, built by Elbit Systems, and used by the United States Department of Defense. It is a modular system, built using COTS hardware, and enclosed in MIL-STD 810 cases, build to withstand harsh conditions and temperatures from -25° to 55°C. The ETC is designed to be used with Military Standard thermal and night vision goggles.

== Specifications ==
Per an Elbit Systems leaflet:

- CPU: Intel Core i7 Quad Core processor
- Memory: 16-32GB DDR4
- Storage: 0.5-2TB 2.5", Removable SSD
- Graphics: Intel UHD Graphics 620
- Navigation: GPS support for GPS, GLONASS, QZSS
- Keyboard and other HIDs
- GVA overlay Function keys, Integrated pointing device
- High definition touch screen with multi touch capability
- Embedded IPM capability
- Display: 12.1 LCD, WXGA, 1280x800 resolution
- 1/0 Ports
- 1 External display
- 2 LAN: 10/100/1000 Ethernet interfaces
- 5 USB 2.0 interface and 1 commercial USB 3.0 interfaces
- 1 Full RS232 port
- 1 RS422 port
- Audio in and out
- Internal built-in speaker
- Input voltage: 16-33V per MIL-STD-1275
- Removable Battery: 14.4v CE compatible
- Li-Ion battery
- Physical Characteristics (nominal):
- Dimensions (mm): 314x240x89
- Weight (kg): <6 (basic configuration)
- Complies with MIL-STD-810G Electromagnetic Compatibility
- Complies with MIL-STD-461E
- Optional PCMCIA digital modem

== Hardware ==
The ETC uses a Pentium III processor, which can be upgraded via a specially designed removable module. It is equipped with a touch screen TFT display, Readable display in direct sunlight, with 600x800 resolution. Removable 10-40gig hard drive, and a removable power supply.

Includes an embedded GPS receiver, LAN jack, USB port, PS2 port. Two PC Card Type II or a single Type III are available. Communications interfaces are supported via Elbit's communications controller, supporting up to six networks at 64 kbit/s. Compatible with Windows or Linux operating systems.

== Operators ==
- Israel: (Israel Defense Forces)
- Netherlands: (Royal Netherlands Army)
- Australia: (Australian Defense Forces)

== See also ==
- Military computers
