= Samson Remote Controlled Weapon Station =

Israeli remote weapon system

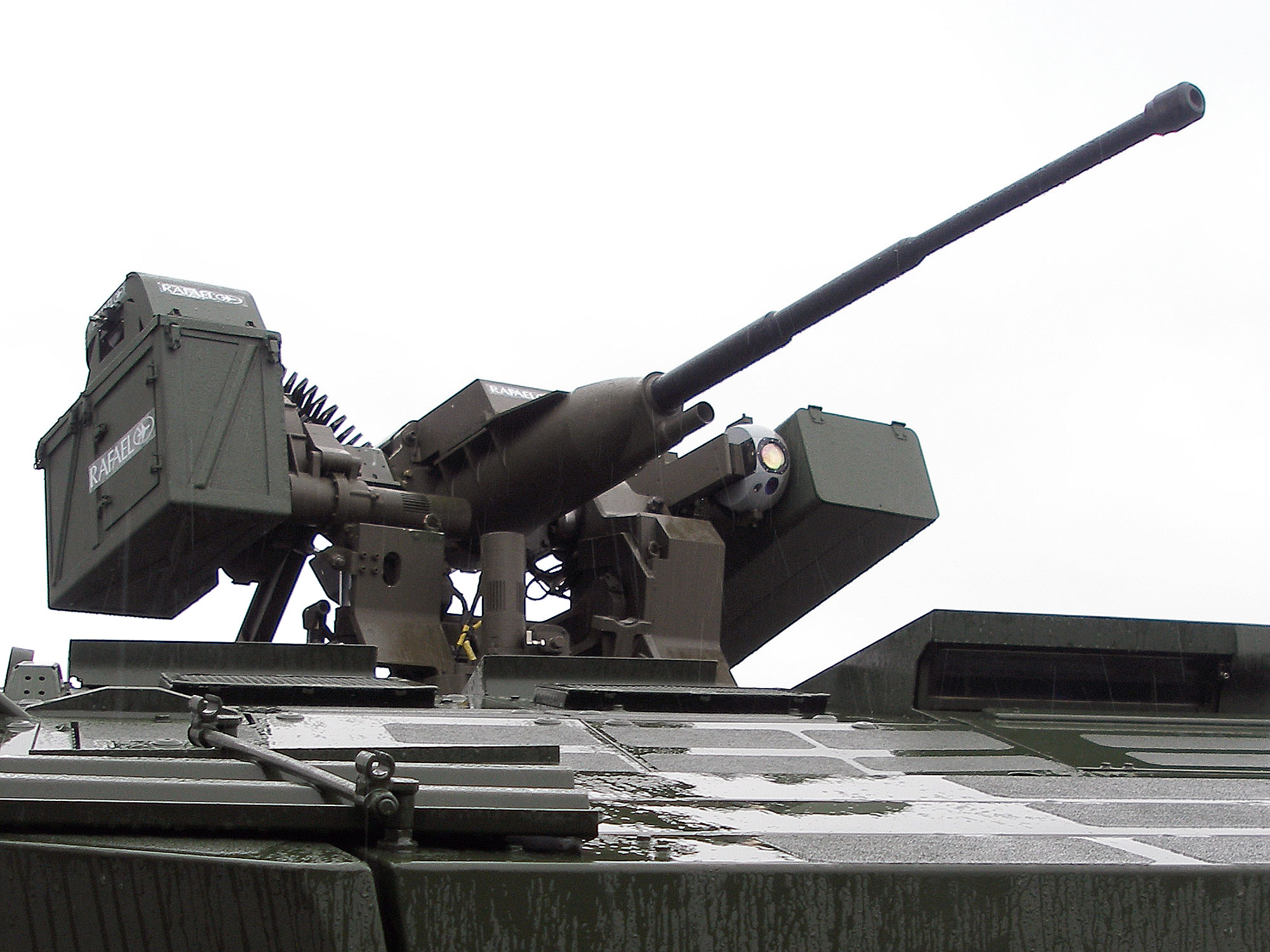
- Samson RCWS mounted on top of a KTO Rosomak prototype in 2007.
- Type: Remote controlled weapon station
- Place of origin: Israel

Service history
- Used by: See Operators

Production history
- Designer: Rafael Advanced Defense Systems
- Manufacturer: Rafael Advanced Defense Systems
- Variants: See Variants

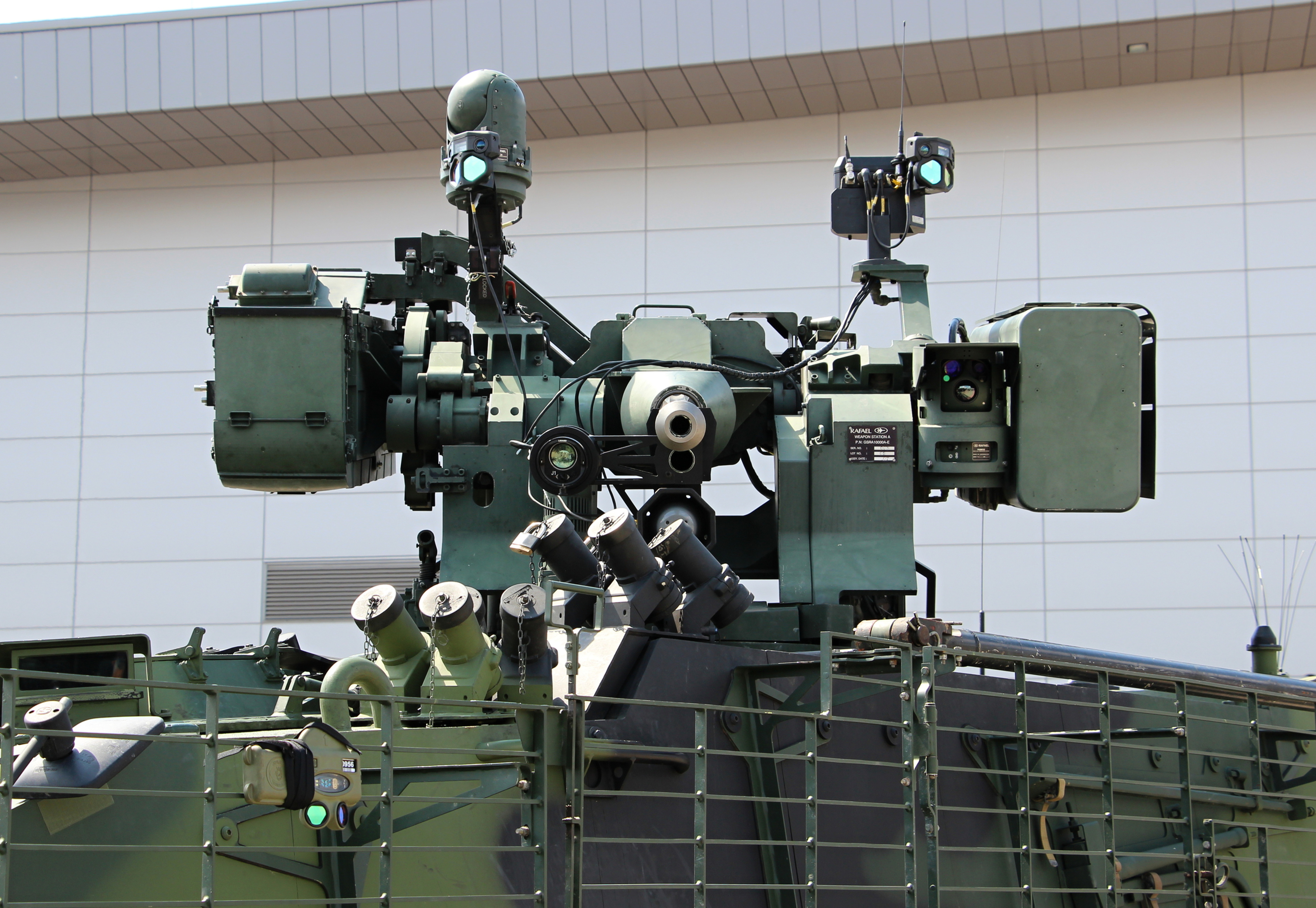
Samson RCWS mounted on Czech Pandur II IFV

The Samson Remote Controlled Weapon Station (RCWS), also known as Katlanit (קטלנית in Hebrew: "lethal") is a remote weapon system (RWS) that enables a variety of devices to be operated automatically or by remote control, including 5.56 mm, 7.62 mm, and 12.7 mm .50 BMG machine guns, 40 mm automatic grenade launchers, anti-tank missiles and observation pods.

== Variants ==
There areseveral variants of the Samson family:

- Samson Jr. ROWS - for 5.56 mm and 7.62 mm machine guns, weighing 60–75 kg (132–165 lb).
- Mini Samson ROWS - for 12.7 mm and 14.5 mm machine guns, as well as 40 mm grenade launcher, weighing 140–160 kg (310–350 lb), similar to that of Mini Typhoon naval ROWS and OWS.
- Standard Samson - for guns with calibre ranging from 20–40 mm (0.79–1.57 in), weighing 1.5 tonnes (1.5 long tons; 1.7 short tons), similar to that of standard Typhoon naval ROWS and OWS.

For example, the Samson Remote Controlled Weapon System for 30 mm autocannon is designed to be mounted on lightly-armoured, high-mobility military vehicles and operated by a gunner or vehicle commander operating under-the-deck. It offers optional SPIKE guided missile, smoke grenade launcher, and embedded trainer. The RCWS 30 is a product of Rafael Advanced Defense Systems.

Israel has also installed a variant of the Samson RCWS in pillboxes along the Israeli Gaza Strip barrier.

The Sentry Tech system, in IDF service deployed on the Gaza fence, enables camera operators located in a rear-located intelligence base to engage border threats using the 12.7 mm heavy machine gun and the SPIKE guided missile.

== Operators ==
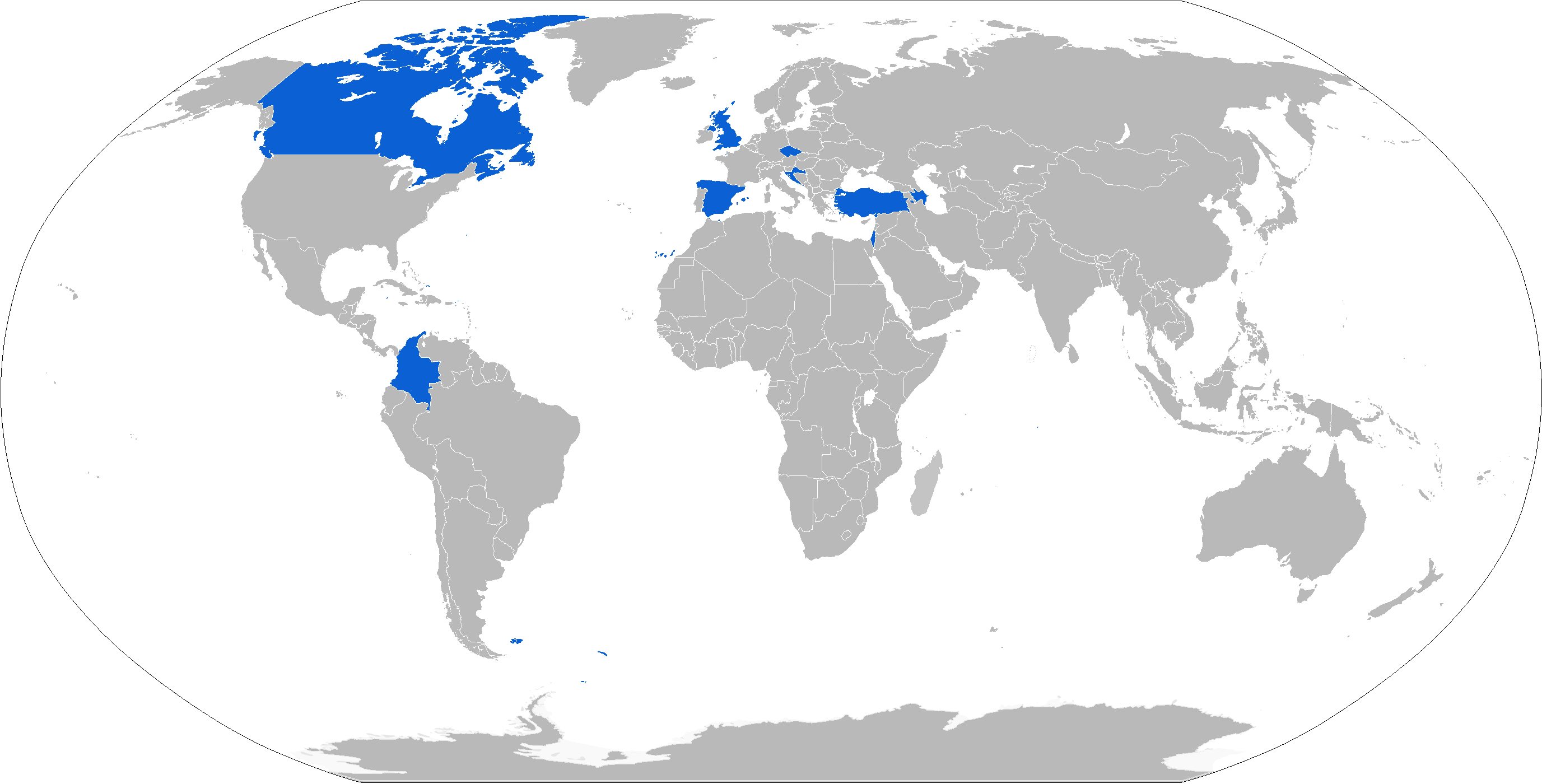
Map of Samson operators in blue

- Colombia: LAV III
- Croatia: 4 stations initially procured for needs of Croatian Army, installed and tested on M84D and M95 tanks, but eventually Croatian Army opted for Protector RWS, 12.7 mm and 30 mm.
- Czech Republic: Pandur II
- Israel: IDF Namer, some IDF Achzarit, some HMMWV
- Lithuania: 88 German Boxer Infantry Fighting Vehicles with Rafael's weapon stations with 30 mm cannons and "Spike LR" antitank missiles
- Singapore: Hunter AFV
- United States: Infantry Carrier Vehicle Dragoon
