= Mitznefet (Israeli military) =

Infantry combat helmet covering

Mitznefet מִצְנֶפֶת
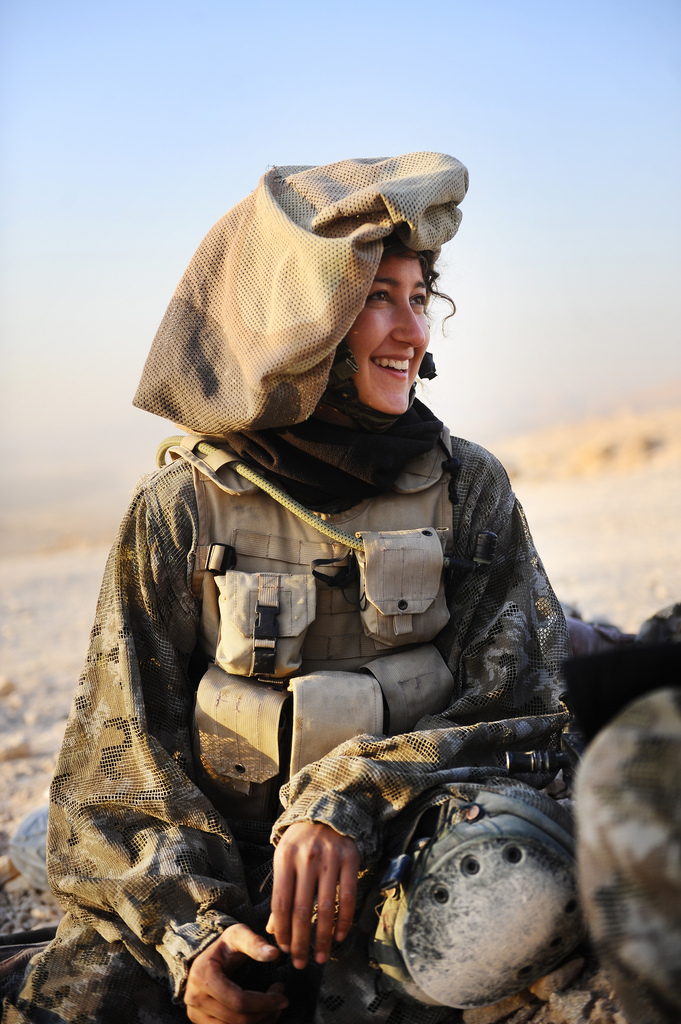
- Close-up of the covering worn by an infantry soldier from the Caracal Battalion, 2011
- Type: Helmet cover
- Place of origin: Israel

Service history
- In service: 1994
- Used by: Israel Defense Forces
- Wars: South Lebanon conflict; First Intifada; Second Intifada; 2006 Lebanon War; Operation Cast Lead; Operation Pillar of Defense; 2014 Gaza War; Operation Guardian of the Walls; Gaza war

Production history
- Manufacturer: Agilite (modern version)

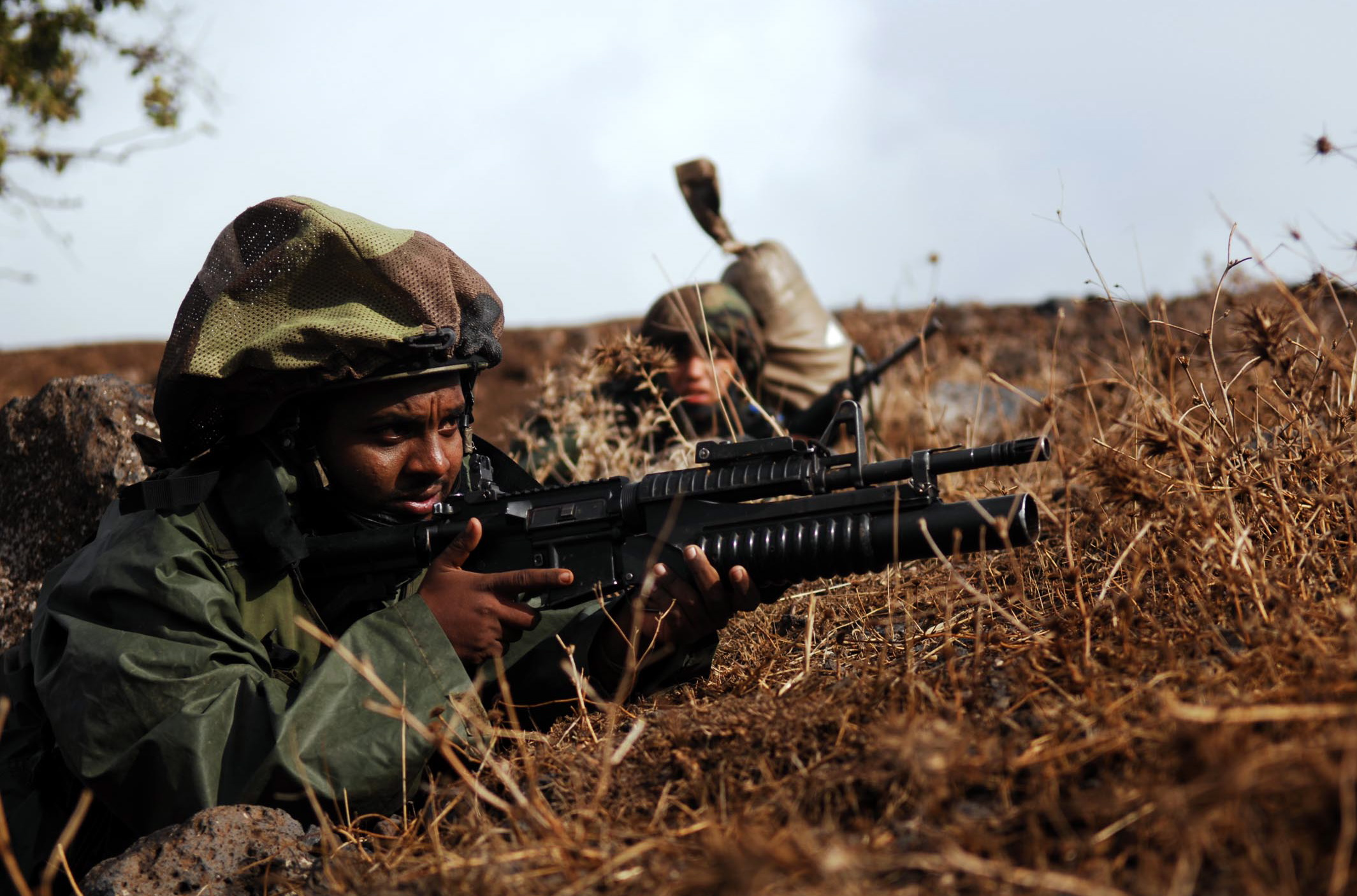
This Israeli paratrooper also wears a mitznefet helmet cover

The mitznefet (Hebrew: מִצְנֶפֶת) is a helmet covering used by the Israel Defense Forces since 1994. It is considerably larger than the helmet worn by infantry soldiers. The main purpose of the covering is to break up what would otherwise be the distinctive outline of a helmeted human head, while also preventing light from reflecting off the wearer's helmet for a tactical advantage, making it easier to camouflage when necessary.

In the Hebrew language, the covering shares the same name as the priestly turban, which was worn by the High Priest of Israel in the Temple of Jerusalem during the Second Temple period. The name originates from a Semitic root meaning to wrap.

== History ==
The mitznefet was originally adopted by the Israeli military in the 1990s to provide tactical advantages to Israeli troops fighting Lebanese guerrillas in the South Lebanon conflict.

It was later configured to have a two-sided camouflage material, with one side adapted for desert environments and the other for woodland terrain.

In 2015, it was reported that the coverings would be supplied to the Armed Forces of Ukraine.

== Design ==
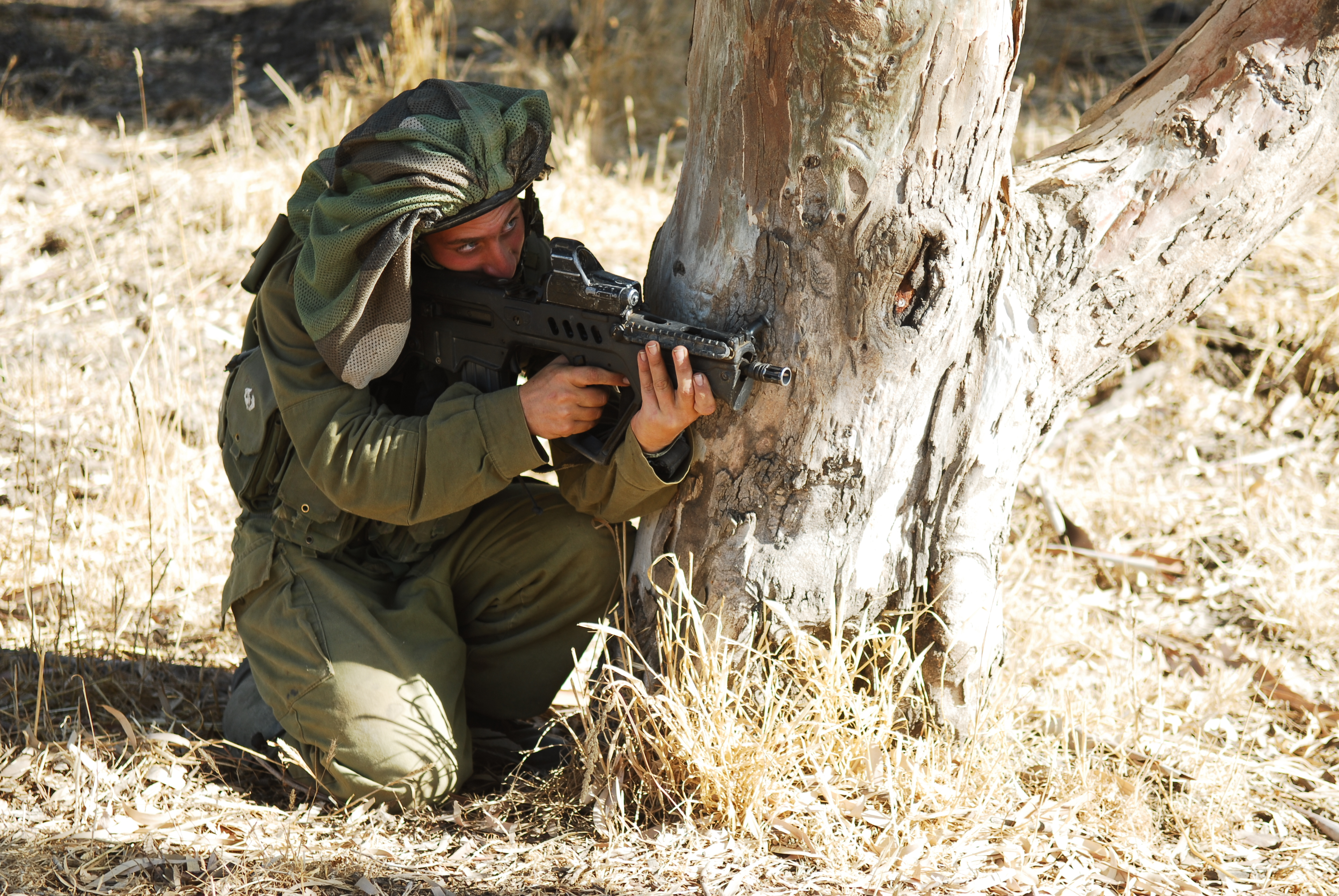
Soldier from the Golani Brigade wearing the covering during a military drill, 2012

The covering is easily removable, and can be attached to the helmet while folded. Additionally, the bulk of the covering can be pulled down to shade and protect any side of the wearer's head from direct sunlight exposure.

It is made up of a reversible mesh fabric, with one side having woodland camo paint and the other side with a brown desert paint. In 2013, the manufacturer Agilite announced a new version with MultiCam.
