= Wolf Armoured Vehicle =

Wolf armoured vehicle
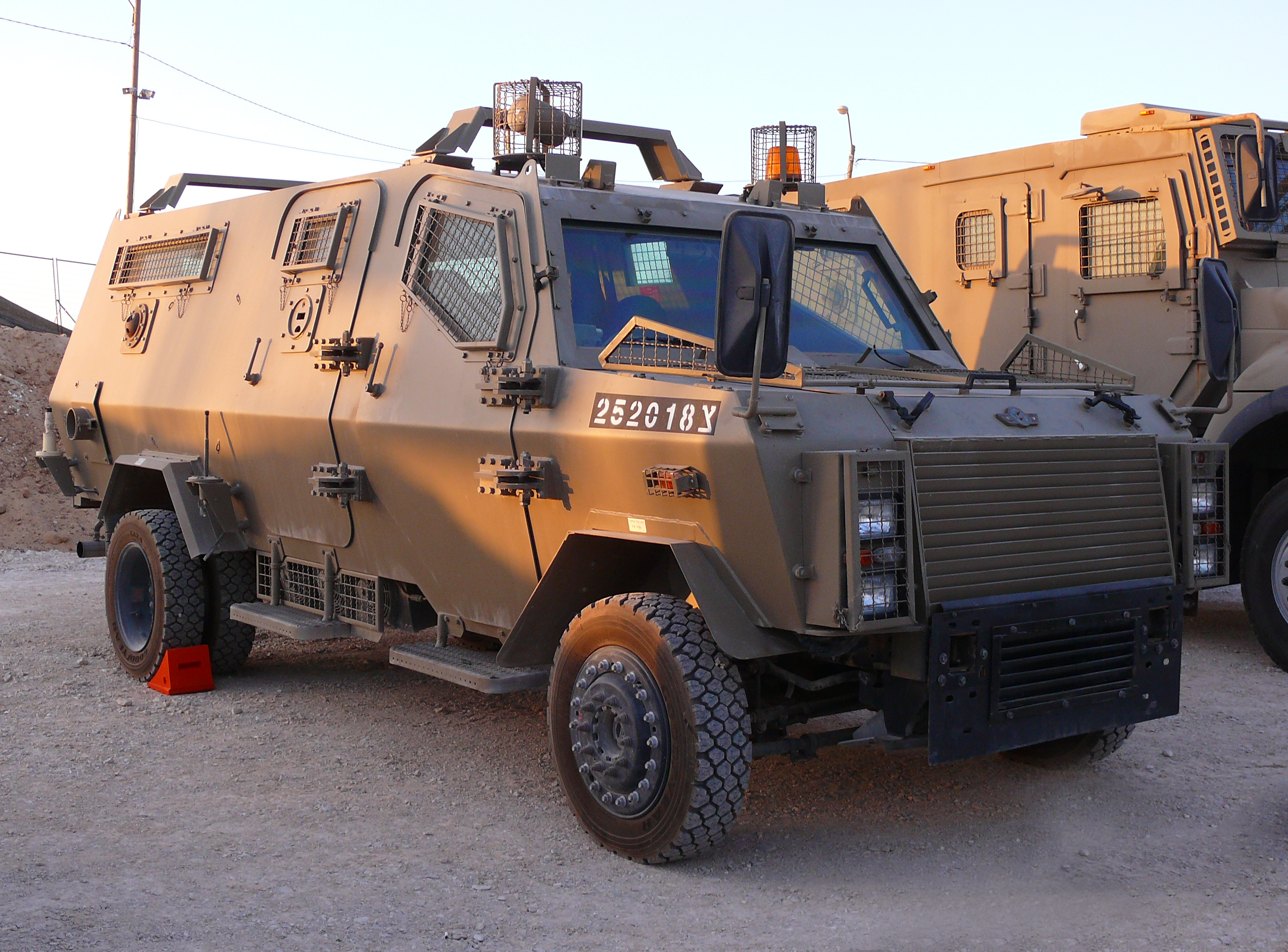
- Type: Armoured vehicle
- Place of origin: Israel

Service history
- In service: 2006–current
- Used by: Israel Defense Forces Defence Forces of Georgia

Production history
- Designer: Hatehof
- Manufacturer: Rafael Advanced Defense Systems and Carmor Integrated Vehicle Solutions
- No. built: 150

Specifications
- Mass: 8 tonnes
- Length: 5.75 meters
- Width: 2.38 meters
- Height: 2.35 meters
- Crew: 12 personnel
- Engine: 6-litre V8 turbo-diesel 325 BHP; Diesel
- Transmission: Five speed automatic

The Wolf Armoured Vehicle (Hebrew: זאב) is an armoured personnel carrier, used mainly by the Israeli Defence Force. It was created to provide a better handling and better protected armoured vehicle than the M113 (Bardelas). The Wolf is a heavily armoured crew carrier, manufactured by the company Carmor. It combines a commercial truck's speed and maneuverability and APC-like armour, qualities necessary for low-intensity confrontation. The Wolf's chassis is based on a Ford F-550 truck, and is equipped with a 6-litre V8 engine capable of reaching 325 horsepower. The engine is combined with a 5-speed automatic transmission, which drives all four wheels, making this a four-by-four.

== Creation ==
=== Concept and purchase ===
The idea for the Wolf was born from the need of transporting soldiers safely during missions in an urban environment, and in peacekeeping missions. Recently the Israeli Ministry of Defense ordered 150 Wolf Armoured Vehicles from Rafael Advanced Defense Systems and an order for Carmor, for some to be used in urban combat. This is currently in production as of 2019. The vehicle's first reported use was by the Israel Defense Forces in Operation Bringing Home the Goods on 14 March 2006.

=== Build ===
The Wolf consists of a commercial off-the-shelf (COTS) Ford F-550 chassis modified by Manning Equipment, an OEM up-fitter located in Louisville, KY so it can be easily maintained anywhere. It is equipped with a diesel, 6 litre 325 HP engine and automatic 5 speed transmission. It can weigh up to 8 tonnes. The automotive systems require no changes when the armor is applied. The armor protects crew compartment, automotive elements and wheels. The armor envelope is built independently from the chassis, so it is possible to use the same armor envelope on another chassis (of the same model) when the chassis goes out for service. The hull roof can accept a Remote Weapon Station (RWS) which allows the occupants to engage enemies without exposure.

The Wolf is a multiroled truck. Its main purpose is for infantry transport, however, some vehicles may be transformed specifically as an ambulance.

=== Design ===
The vehicle is completely protected, including the wheels, which have run flat tires. The armour is 3 long tons (3,048 kg), and is not critical to the Wolf's overall weight, since its maximum load is 8 long tons (8,128 kg). All of the doors of the vehicle are bulletproof, including the engine and gearbox compartments. There are six doors—four on the sides and two at the rear—that enable troops to get in and out easily and quickly with all of their equipment. The vehicle interior is equipped with a double air conditioning system, seats and brackets for items that a soldier might need. Since no major changes have been done to the F-550 chassis, except the addition of armor, the vehicle does not have any problems with engine overheating or handling. The Wolf weighs approximately 8 long tons (8,128 kg), and can carry a crew of up to 12 personnel, with an additional 2 stretch beds, if necessary. The doors are designed for a quick getaway. Most of the original parts were kept, with the only notable changes being the rear axle and tires.

== Operators ==
=== Current operators ===
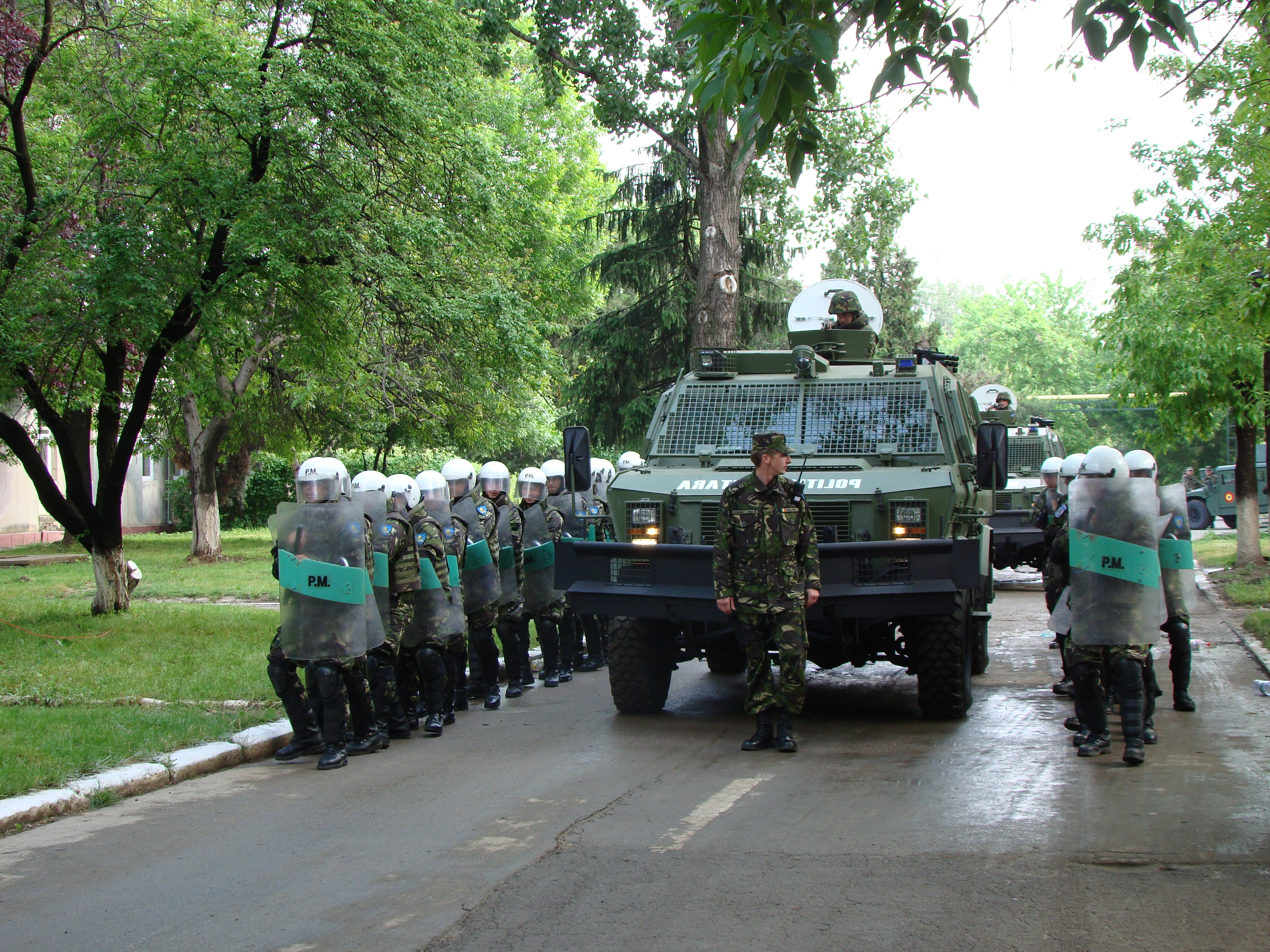
Wolf Armoured Vehicles of the Romanian Military Police

- Brazil – Military Police of São Paulo State.
- Georgia – at least 28 operated by both military and police units.
- Ethiopia – Ethiopian National Defense Force 5 bought, 70 more to be made under local production.
- Israel – Israel Defense Forces.
- North Macedonia – used by law enforcement agencies.
- Romania – used by the Military Police units of the Romanian Land Forces.
- Peru – 13 Military Police

== Gallery ==
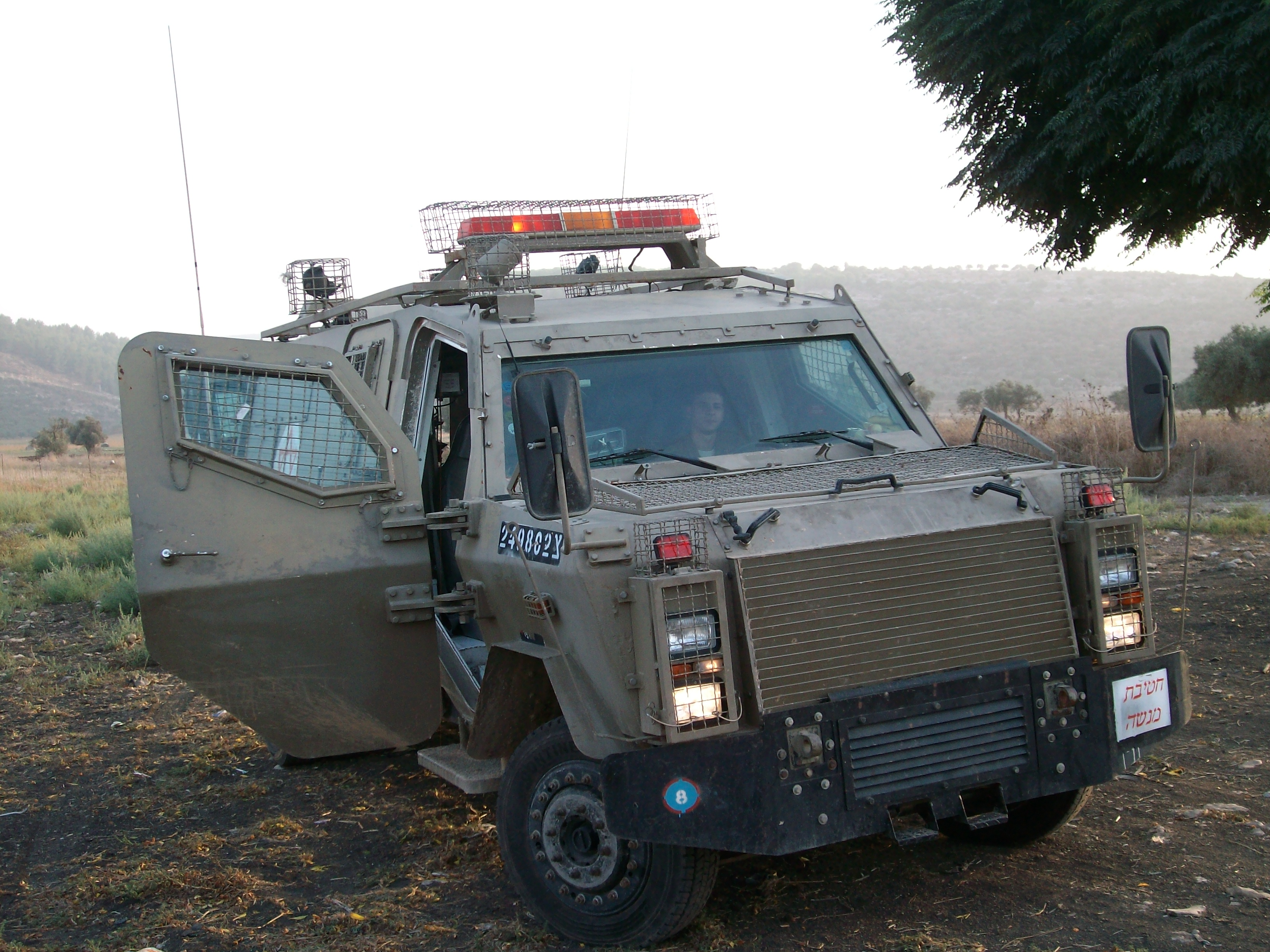

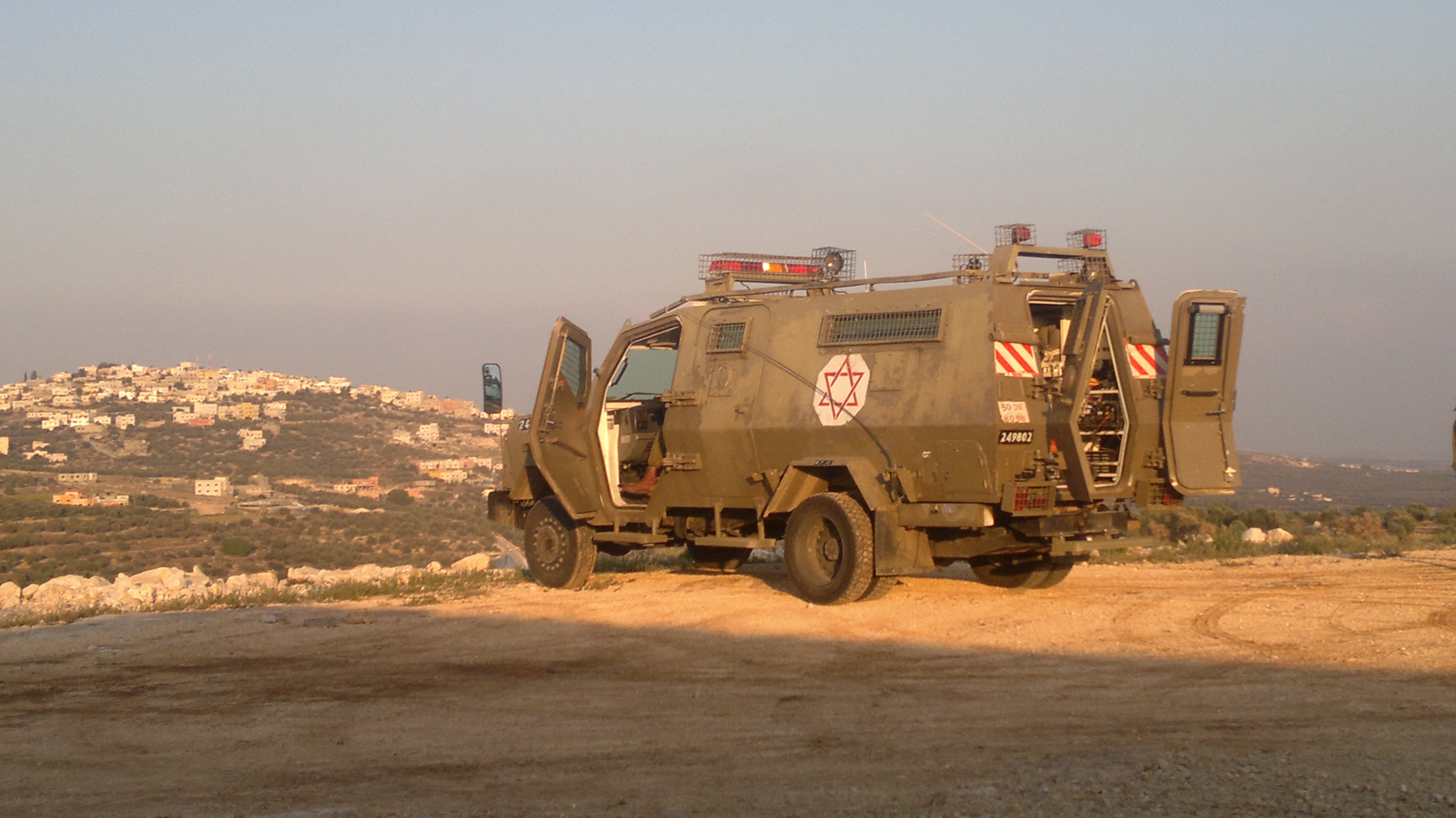

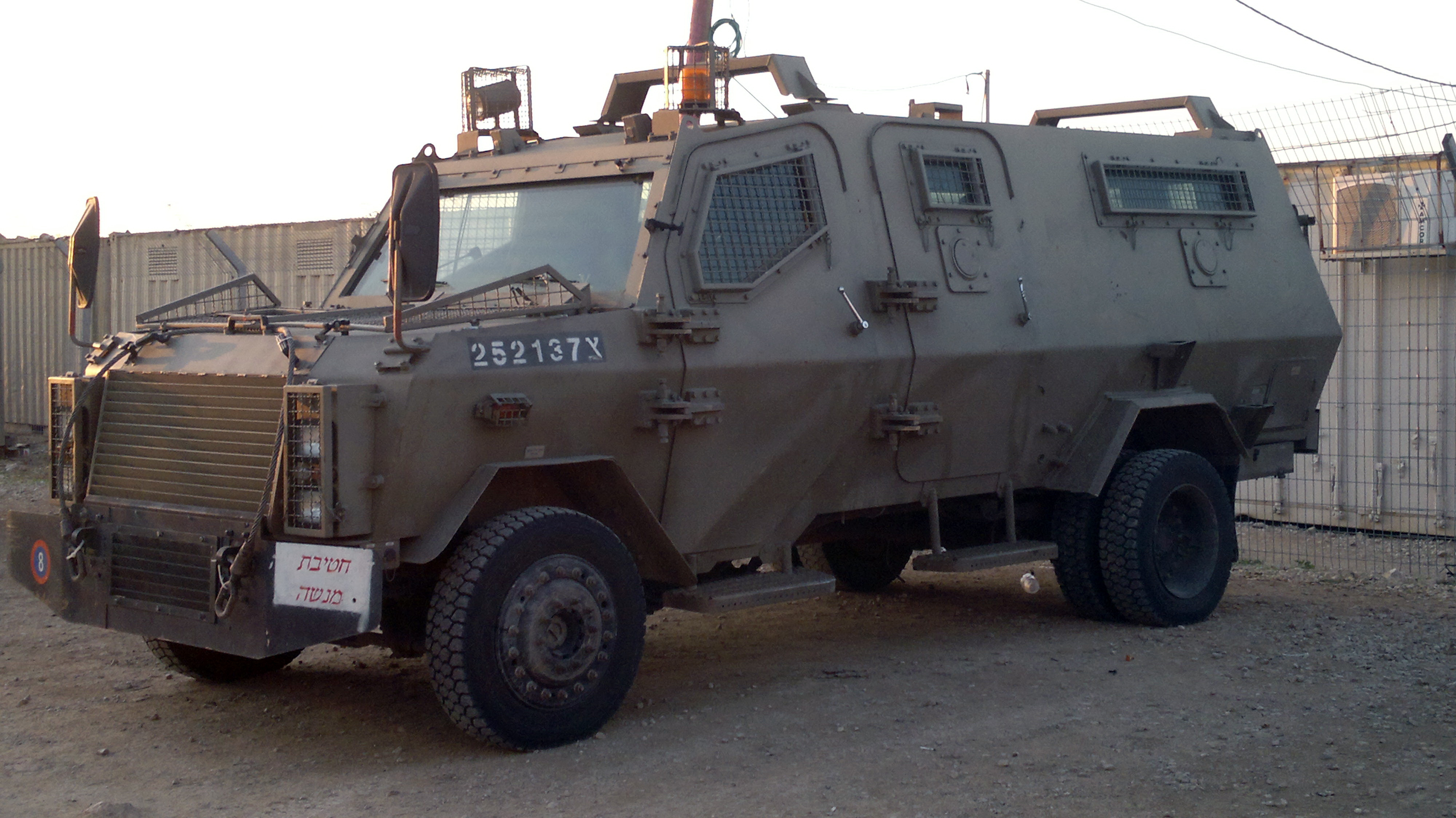

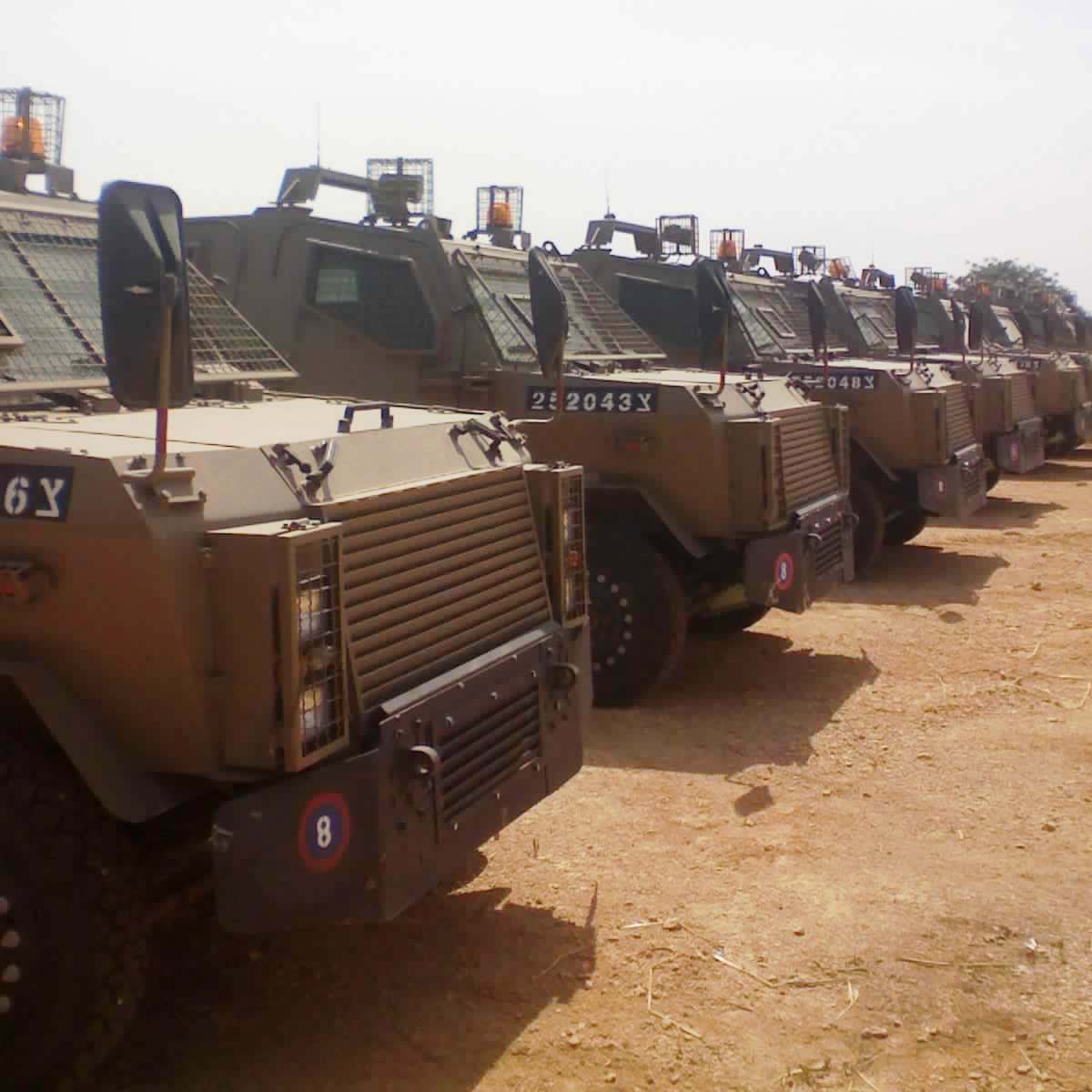

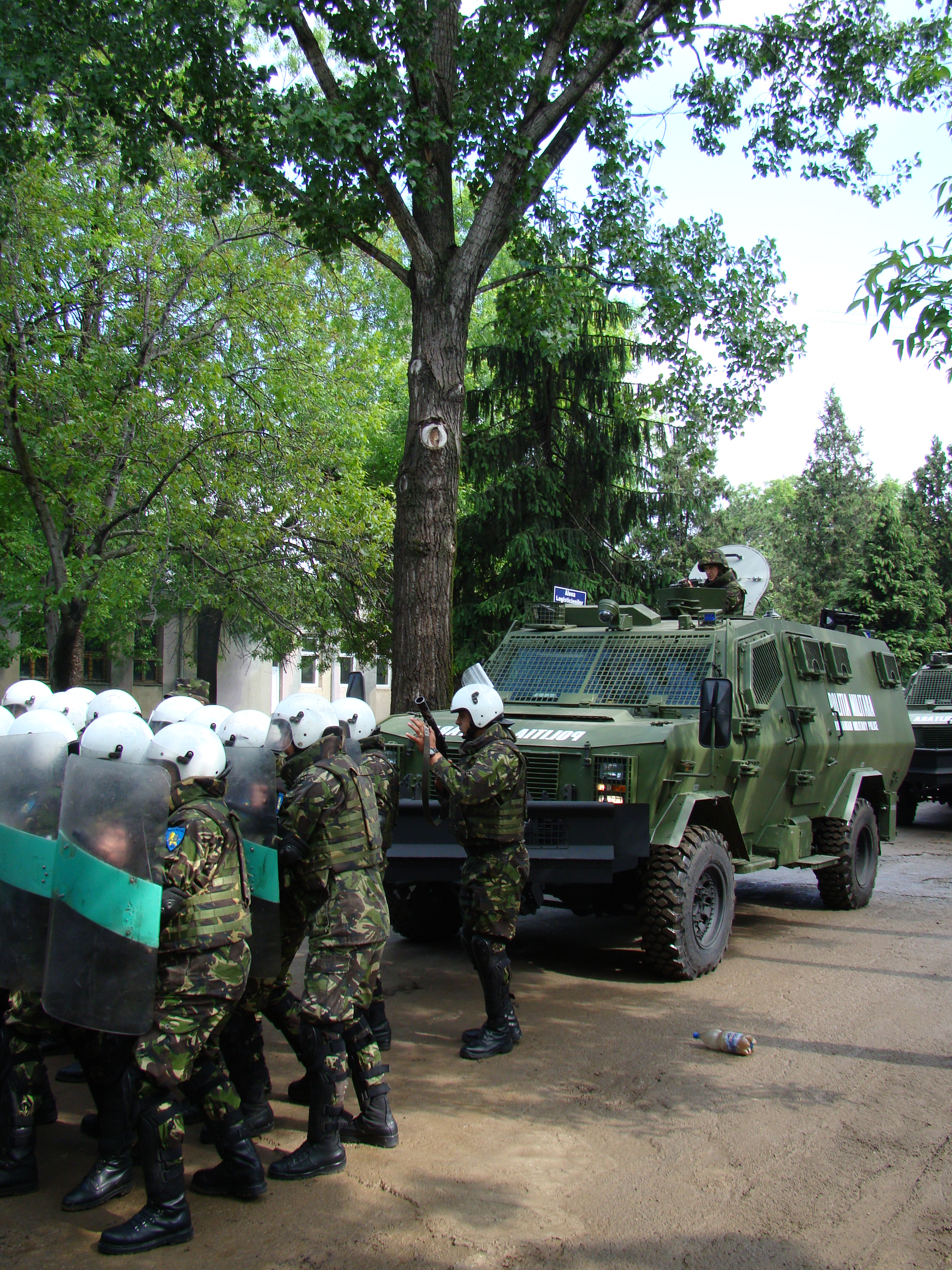

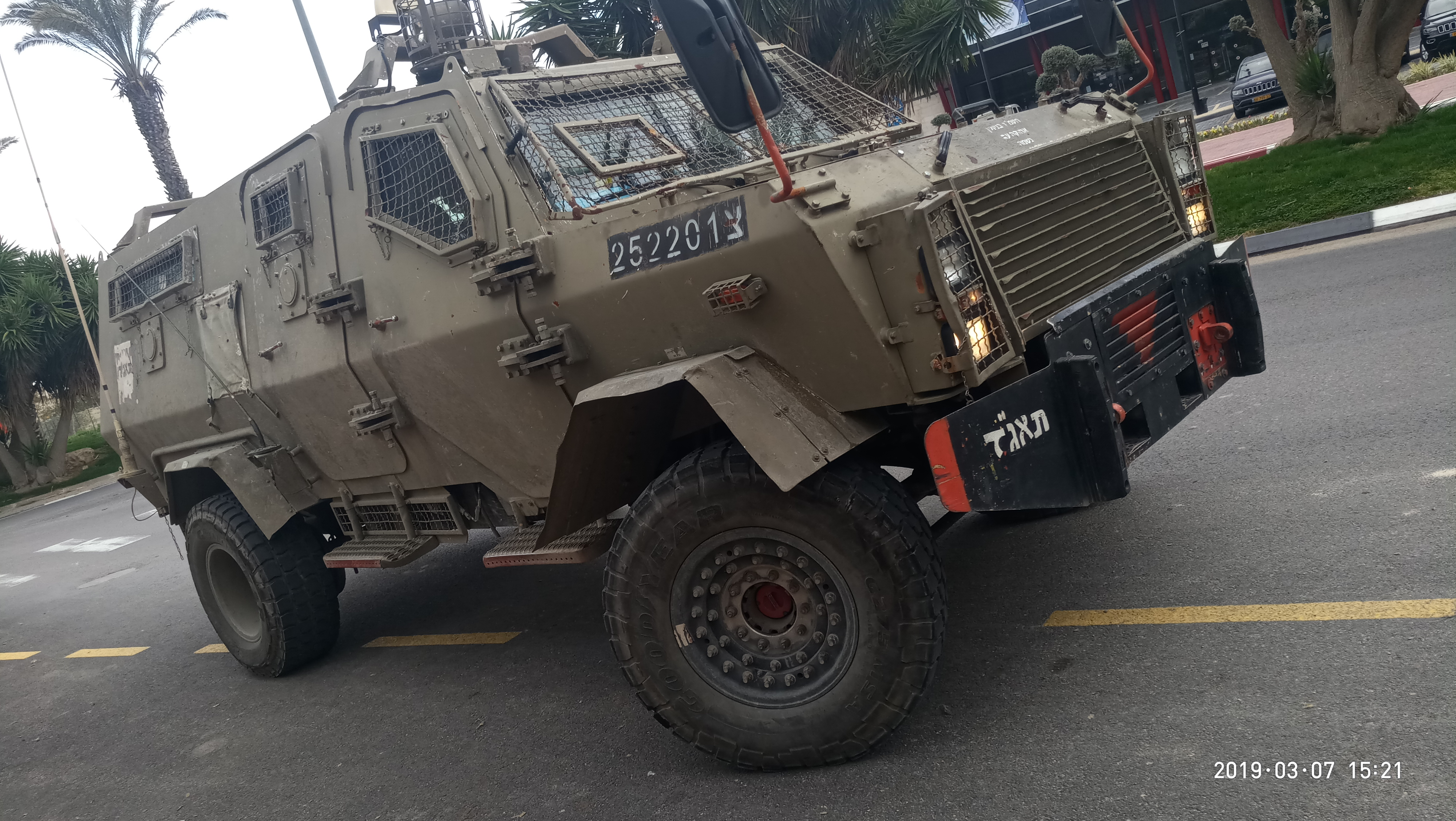

== See also ==
- AIL M325 Command Car
- AIL Abir
- AIL Storm
- Guardium
- Humvee
- MDT David
- Military light utility vehicle
- Plasan Sand Cat
