= AIL Desert Raider =

M-626 Desert Raider

Service history
- Used by: Israel

Production history
- Manufacturer: Automotive Industries

Specifications
- Mass: 1450 kg
- Length: 4100 mm
- Width: 2000 mm
- Height: 1850 mm
- Maximum speed: 110 kph

The AIL Desert Raider is an Israeli 6x6 buggy. It is used for surveillance purposes. It is marketed as an airborne, all terrain reconnaissance, surveillance and fast attack vehicle.
