= Carmor =

Israeli Automotive Defense Company

Carmor Integrated Vehicle Solutions Ltd
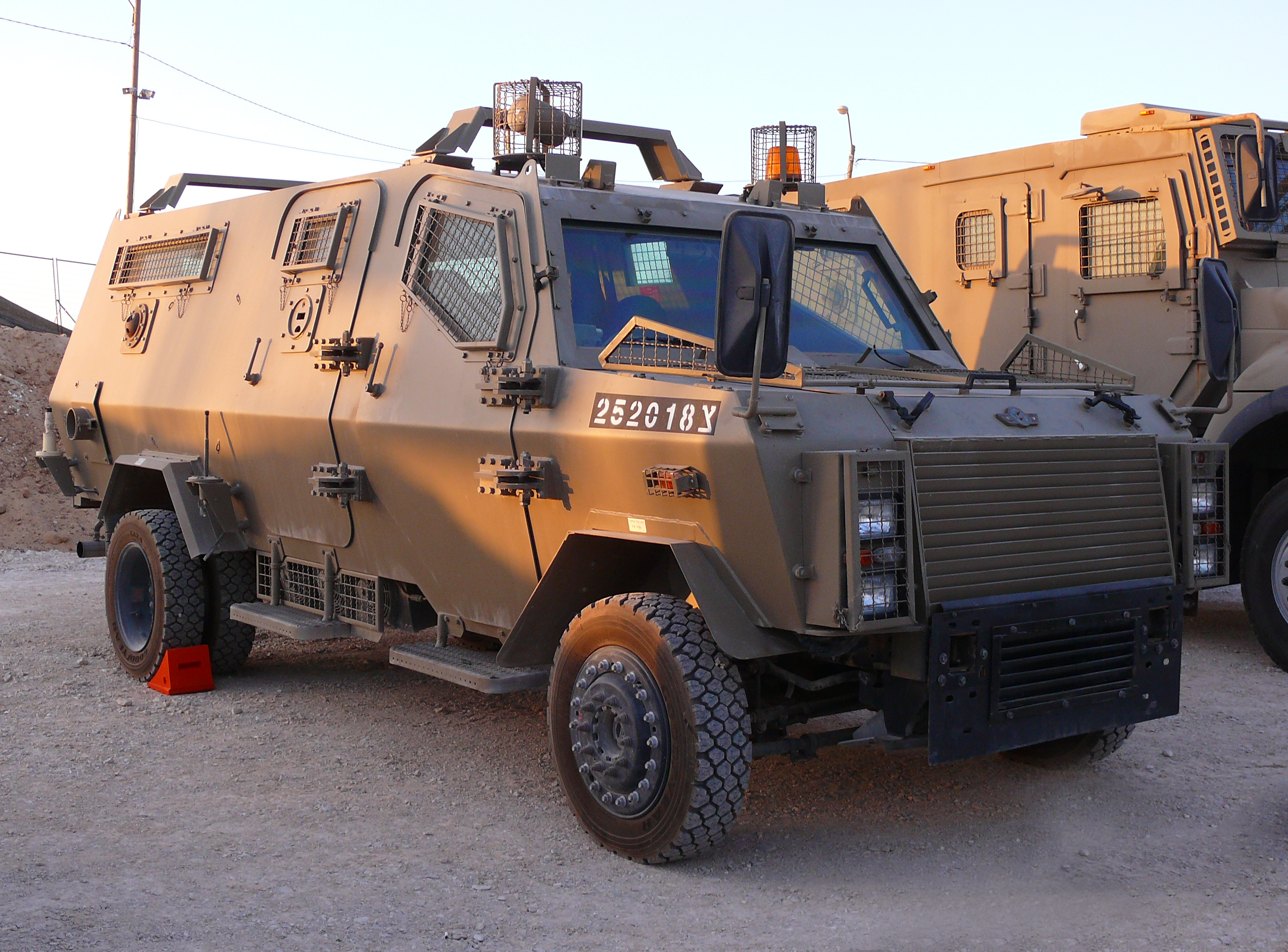
- Wolf Armoured Vehicle manufactured by Carmor
- Company type: Public company
- Industry: Automotive, Defense
- Founded: 1947; 79 years ago
- Headquarters: Ziporit industrial park, Nazareth, Israel
- Production output: Tankers, Aircraft refuelers, Fire engines, Armored vehicles and Special purpose trailers
- Revenue: ₪ 244.7 million (2015)
- Number of employees: 321 (2015)
- Parent: Brand Industries Ltd.

Carmor Integrated Vehicle Solutions (previously known as Hatehof) is an Israeli company that manufactures tankers, aircraft refuelers, fire fighting trucks, armored vehicles and special purpose trailers.

== Overview ==
Carmor is based in the Ziporit industrial zone in Nazareth Illit, Israel.

The company employs a team of engineers from many fields, and works on multiple projects/builds simultaneously. Carmor currently has around 100 employees and provides the required services in-house, such as the design, manufacture, assembly, inspection, professional literature, and cataloging. It is also a major supplier to the Israeli army.

== History ==
Carmor was found in 1947 as Ha-tech-of - Haifa Technical Office, as a workshop for installing armour on tracks, to protect them against rifle fire during the 1947–48 Civil War in Mandatory Palestine, prior to the Israeli Declaration of Independence.

In 1954, Carmor started manufacturing Fuel tankers and Aircraft refuelers, and become the major supplier to the Israeli Civil and military markets.

In 1981, Carmor had an initial public offering on the Tel Aviv Stock Exchange, raising funds to enable the company to diversify and expand its product lines. The company started manufacturing Fire engines and Vehicle Trailer.

In 2001, Carmor signed a deal to supply airplane and helicopter refuelers to the Turkish Army. The contract was worth some NIS 28 million.

In 2005, Carmor introduced the Wolf Armoured Vehicle, a 4x4 multi-purpose armored vehicle with a high degree of flexibility, built utilizing a low-cost commercial 4x4 chassis of the Ford F550 with an automatic gearbox driven by a diesel engine, jointly developed with Rafael Advanced Defense Systems. The vehicle's armor and design offers a high degree of protection. It is available in troop carrier, command vehicle, rescue vehicle, logistics support and ambulance configurations. The Israel Ministry of Defense placed a $20 million order for Wolf Armoured Vehicle. The vehicles replaced aging light vehicles used by the Armed Forces of Israel.

In 2011, the company was in financial straits due to a drop in orders and NIS 200 million in debts. The company's creditor banks appointed a trustee to save it.

In 2016 Hatehof was renamed Carmor.

== Products ==
=== Armoured vehicles ===
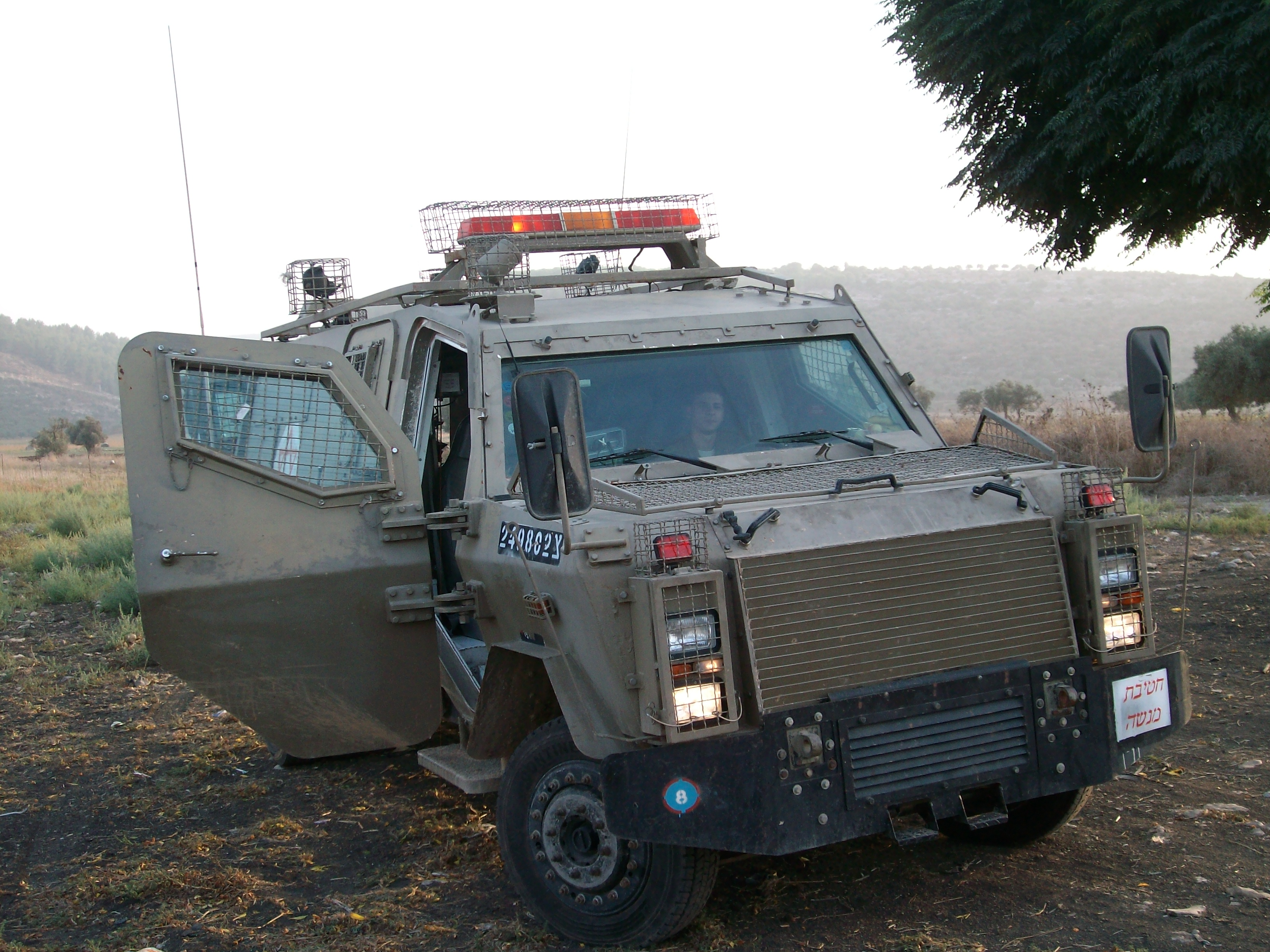
Wolf Armoured Vehicle configured as an Ambulance

- Zibar Ultra-High Mobility Special Operations Vehicle
- Wolf Armoured Vehicle
- Hurricane MRAP
- Mantis MRAP
- Xtream High Mobility Armored Vehicle

=== Homeland security ===
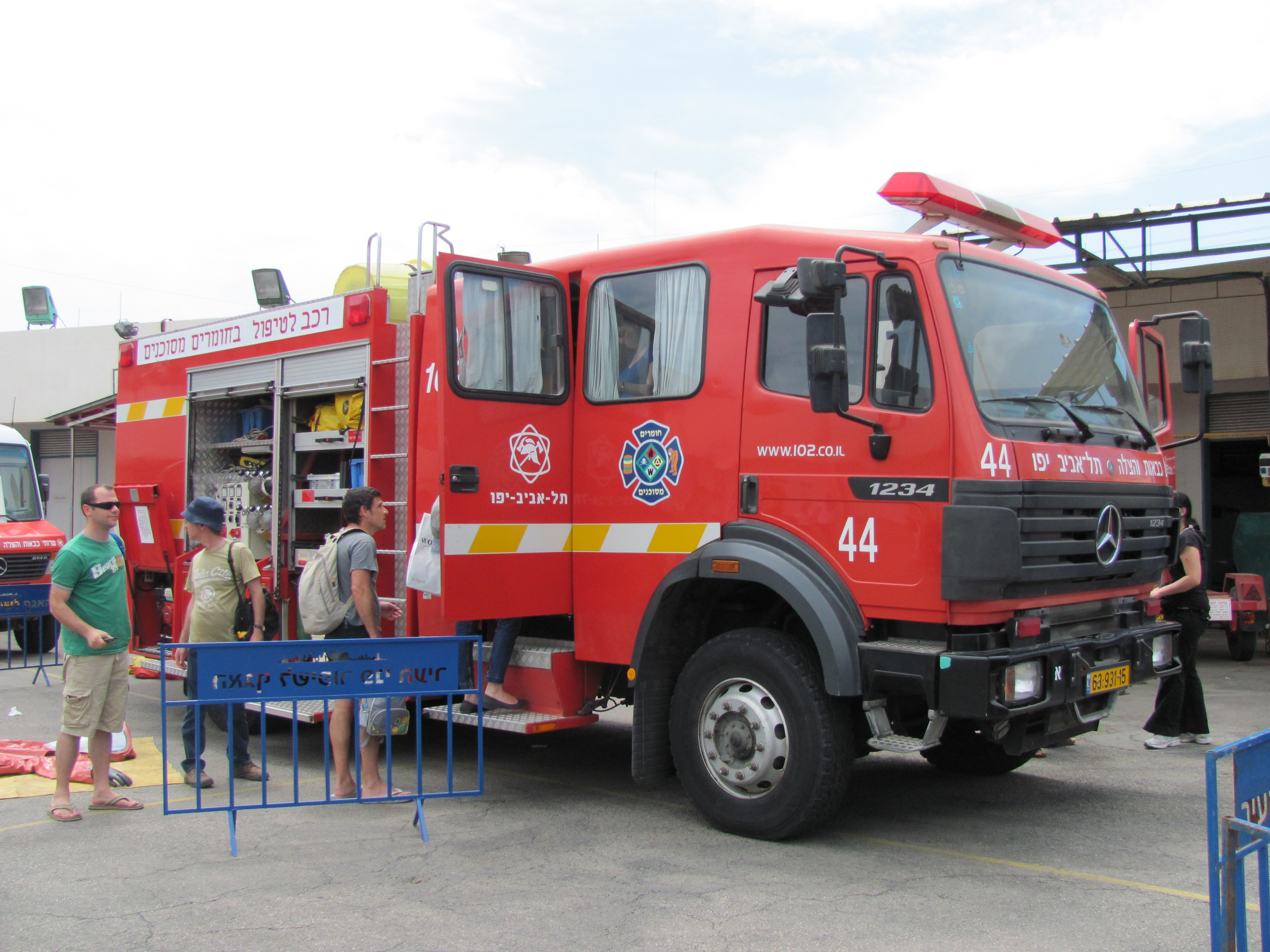
Fire engine built by Carmor using a Mercedes-Benz chassis

- Fire engines
- Riot control Vehicles

=== Civilian ===
- Tank trucks
- Aircraft refuelers
