= Automotive Industries Ltd. =

Automobile manufacturer

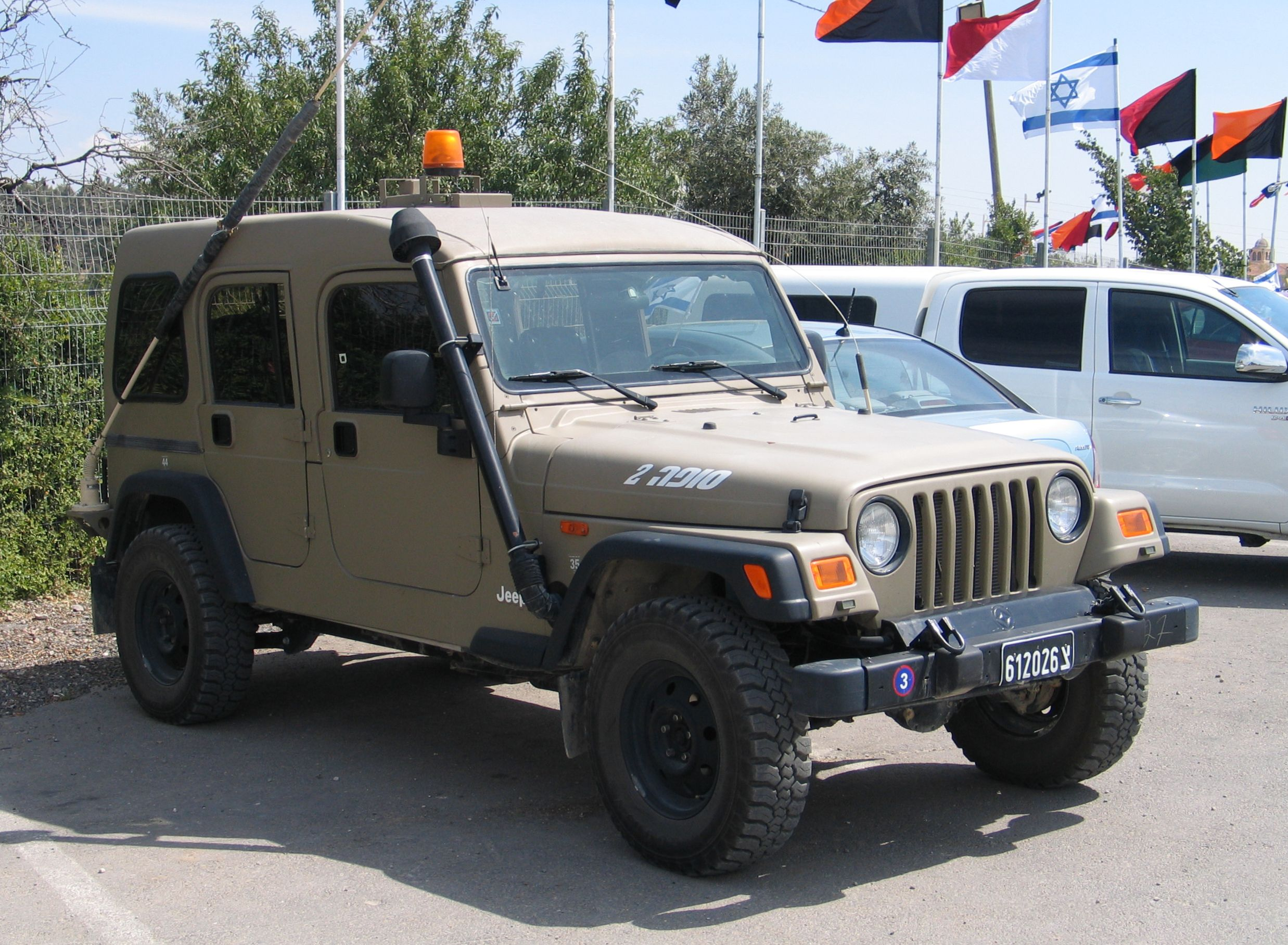
- Industry: Automotive
- Founded: 1966; 60 years ago
- Headquarters: Nof HaGalil, Israel
- Products: Tactical vehicles, Armored vehicles
- Website: ail.co.il

Automotive Industries Ltd. (Hebrew: תעשיות רכב נצרת עלית, תע"ר, Ta'asiyot Rekhev Natzrat Ilit, AIL) is an Israeli automaker and major supplier of the Israeli Security Forces.

== History ==
Located in Nof HaGalil, the company was founded in 1966 by Automotive Equipment Group as a plant for the assembly of cars and trucks. AIL has since increased its role in the vehicle manufacture, doing much of the work on several early Willys MB-derivatives, and the more recent M462 trucks and AIL Storm (Sufa) series of Jeep Wrangler derivatives, and the AIL Desert Raider.

AIL was also an assembly-point for the Israel Defense Forces of Humvees, but U.S. foreign aid guarantees caused contracts to be moved to plants in the United States. AIL has developed the Storm III which began production in August 2008.

== Models ==
=== Tactical vehicles ===
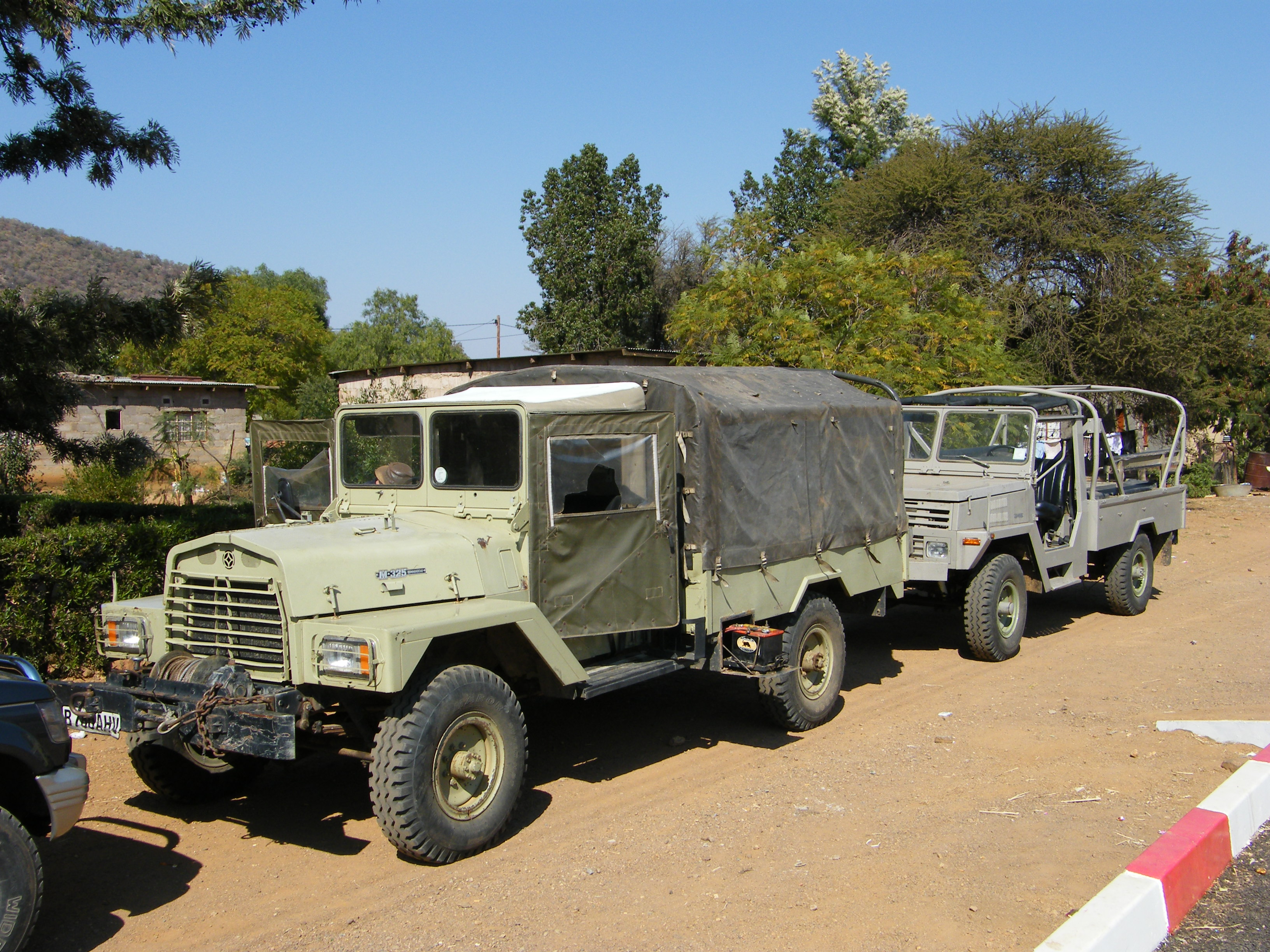
AIL M325 and M462 ABIR

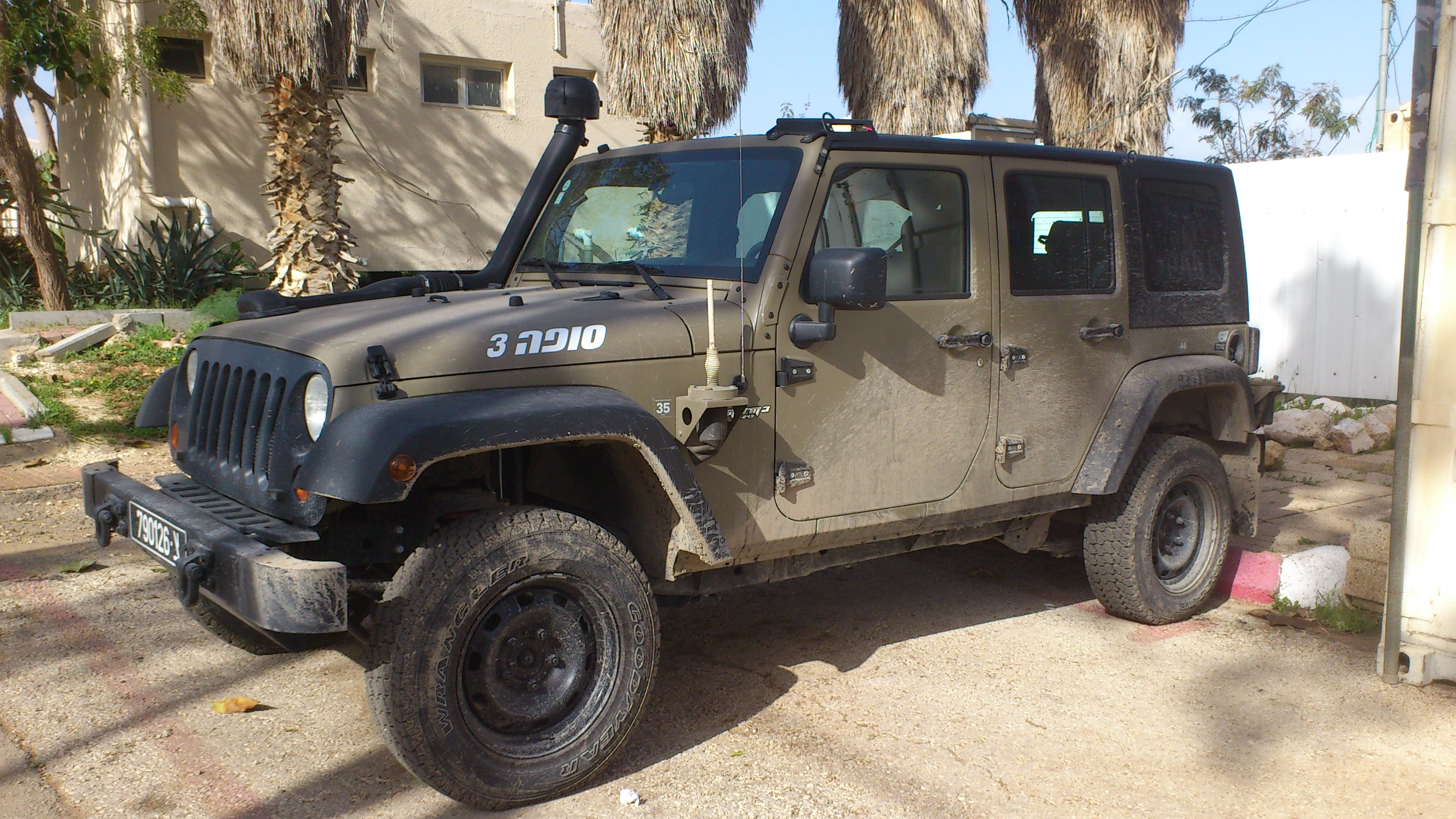
Storm III

- Military Light Tactical Vehicle, based on the Jeep J8, jointly developed with Sanyang Industrial of Taiwan, entered service in 2015.

=== Current production ===
- AIL Storm (1987–present)
  - AIL Storm III – the current version
- HMMWV (assembly)
- AIL Desert Raider – (1998–present)

=== Former production ===
- Willys MB (assembly) (1966–1983)
- AIL Abir (1966–1987)
  - AIL Abir II – a militarized Ram truck
- AIL M325 Command Car (1970–1993)

=== Armored vehicles ===
- Antelope – light multipurpose armored vehicle mounted on a RAM 550 truck chassis
- Avner – an armored AIL built body mounted on a RAM 550 truck chassis.

== Projects ==
- AMSTAF – developed in conjunction with Automotive Robotic Industry Ltd. (ARI). The AMSTAF is an ARGO 6×6 based remote-controlled light armored vehicle.
