= AIL M325 Command Car =

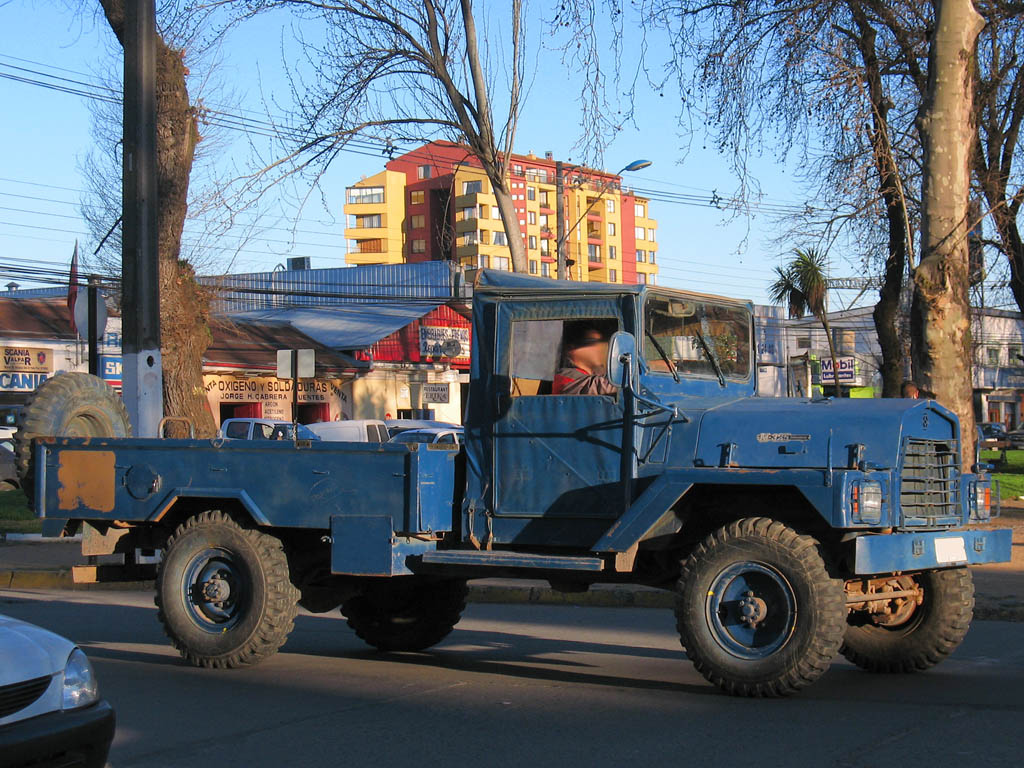

Overview
- Manufacturer: Automotive Industries Limited
- Assembly: Nazareth, Israel

Body and chassis
- Layout: Front engine, four wheel drive

Powertrain
- Engine: Chrysler 227 3.7 litre slant-six cylinder, capable of 100 hp @ 3600 rpm and a consumption of 6 km/L at 100 km/h
- Transmission: NP 435 4-speed gearbox giving a 4.88:1 drive ratio. Standard with Braden PTO winch

Dimensions
- Wheelbase: 126 in
- Length: 200 in
- Width: 82 in
- Height: 93 in
- Curb weight: 2600 kg

The AIL M325 Command Car is a 4x4 military truck produced by the Automotive Industries Limited (AIL) of Nazareth in Israel from 1970 to 1993 for use by the Israel Defense Forces. The M325 is a light, versatile truck designed for carrying up to 12 troops and radio equipment while being fitted with up to four 7.62 mm machine guns. Mechanically, it is based on the Dodge Power Wagon, which it succeeded in service for the Israel Defense Forces.

The Hebrew abbreviation for "weapon carrier" (noseh neshek), Nun-Nun, has come to refer to the M-325.

== History ==
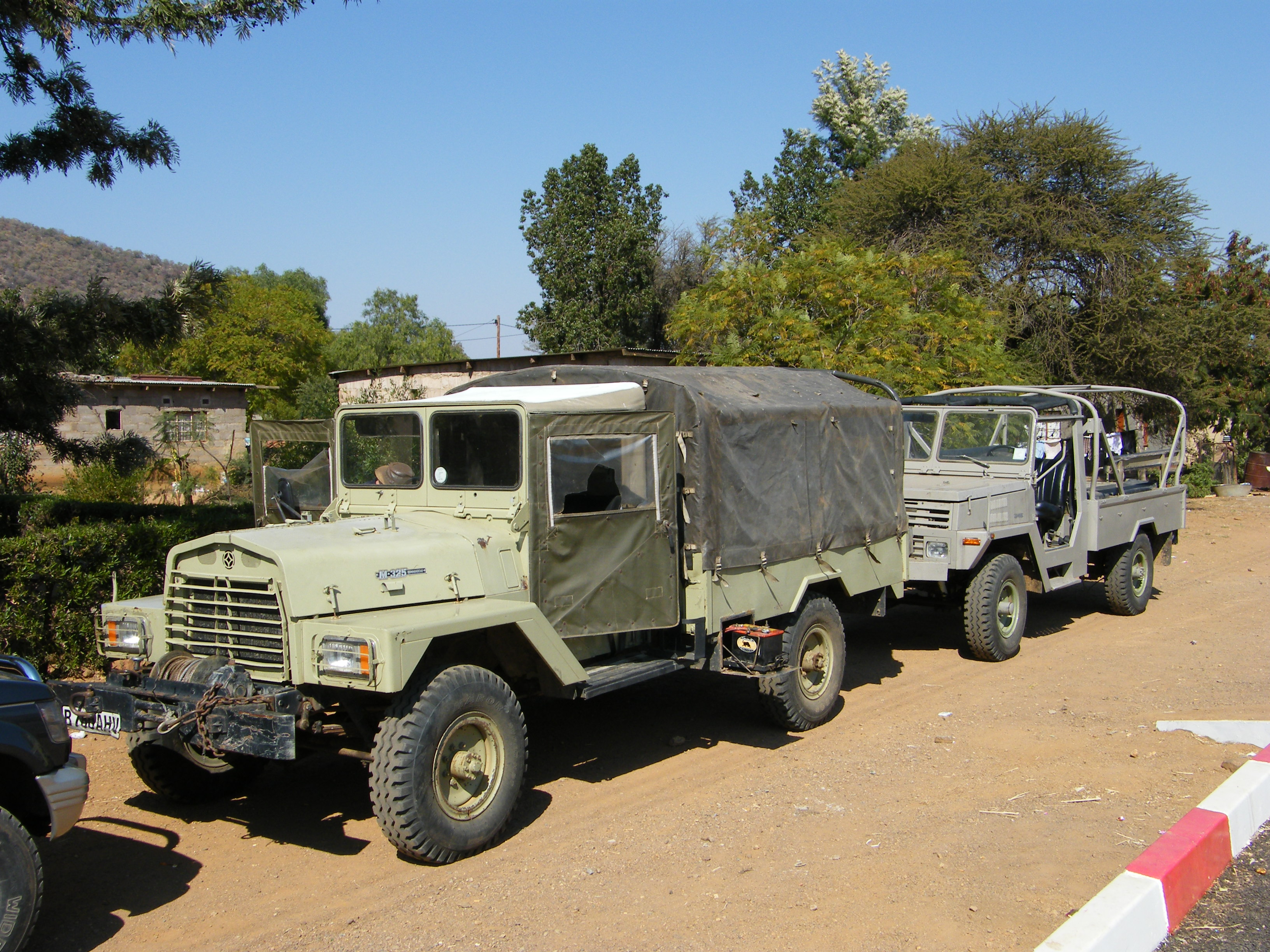
Ex-Botswana Defence Force (BDF) M325 Command Car (front) and the M462 ABIR which succeeded it in service for the BDF (rear)

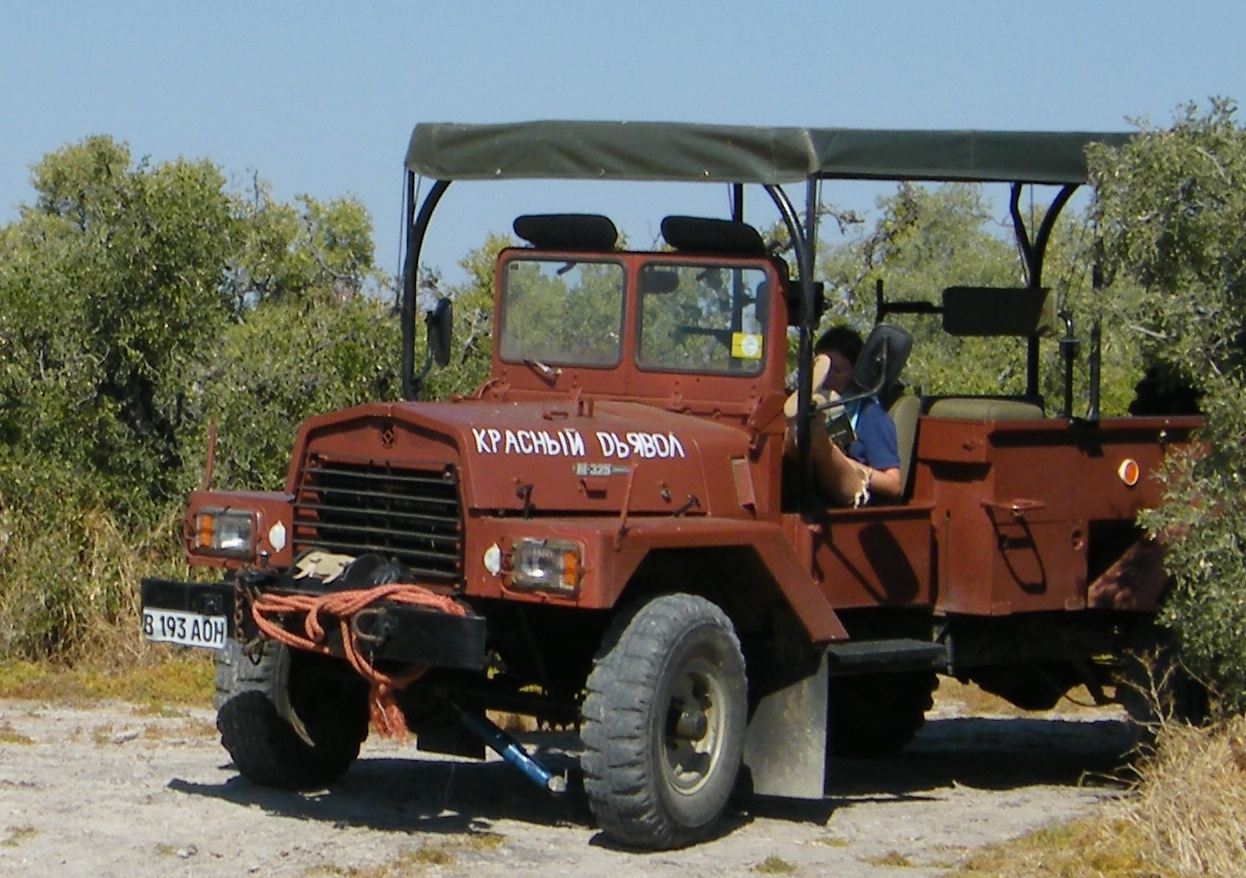
Ex-Botswana Defence Force M325 Command Car (Patrol type) in civilian use in the Tuli Block, Botswana

The Israeli government were long time users of Dodge vehicles, with many numbers of ex World War Two Dodge Weapons Carriers (Dodge WC series) being used. These were later supplemented by open cabbed Dodge WM 300 and M601 Power Wagons assembled by AIL. In 1970, the M325 Command Car was first produced to replace the Power Wagons, on classic Dodge M601 chassis with Chrysler components and AIL bodywork. These early production models were characterised by Dodge axles, vertical grille bars and round headlights while later models had horizontal grille bars and square headlights. The later models were fitted with a Chrysler 227 slant-six cylinder 3.7 litre engine, NP 435 4 speed gearbox. The NP transfer case gave a 4.88:1 final drive ratio. The late-model chassis boasted Dana 70 rear axles and Dana 60 front axles with disc brakes and hydraulic-assisted steering. Production-fitted tyres were 9.00x16 Alliance versions of the Michelin. Winch equipped vehicles were fitted with a Braden winch driven from the gearbox power take-off (PTO), while some late production models were fitted with electric Superwinches. The AILs are known for their superior off-road capabilities with low gearing (82:1), good ground clearance (16 inches) and ample power given by the 3.7 litre Chrysler engine.

== Variants ==
The AIL M325 was produced in a number of versions. The Cargo A version was designed as a personnel carrier with seats placed along the sides facing inwards, being able to carry 12 men and their equipment. The Cargo B was designed as a command and reconnaissance vehicle. Outwardly similar to the Cargo A, an open light truck, but with seats mounted centrally facing outwards and mounting FN MAG machine guns on each side, and one on the dashboard in front of the co-driver,. These vehicles have a removable canvas or nylon cab with doors, roll bars and a canvas covering for the rear. They were also used to tow the 105 mm gun.

A third version used for border patrol work in Israel has an open cab separately mounted from the firewall, and a rear body designed to deflect mine blast. This was equipped with three 7.62 FN MAG mountings in the rear and one on the dashboard. Jump seats were provided for two radio operators behind the driver and co-driver. These trucks were provided with characteristic round roll bars and a full-length canvas or nylon roof to keep the sun off the crew. Further versions were produced as ambulances and enclosed bodied radio-command trucks.

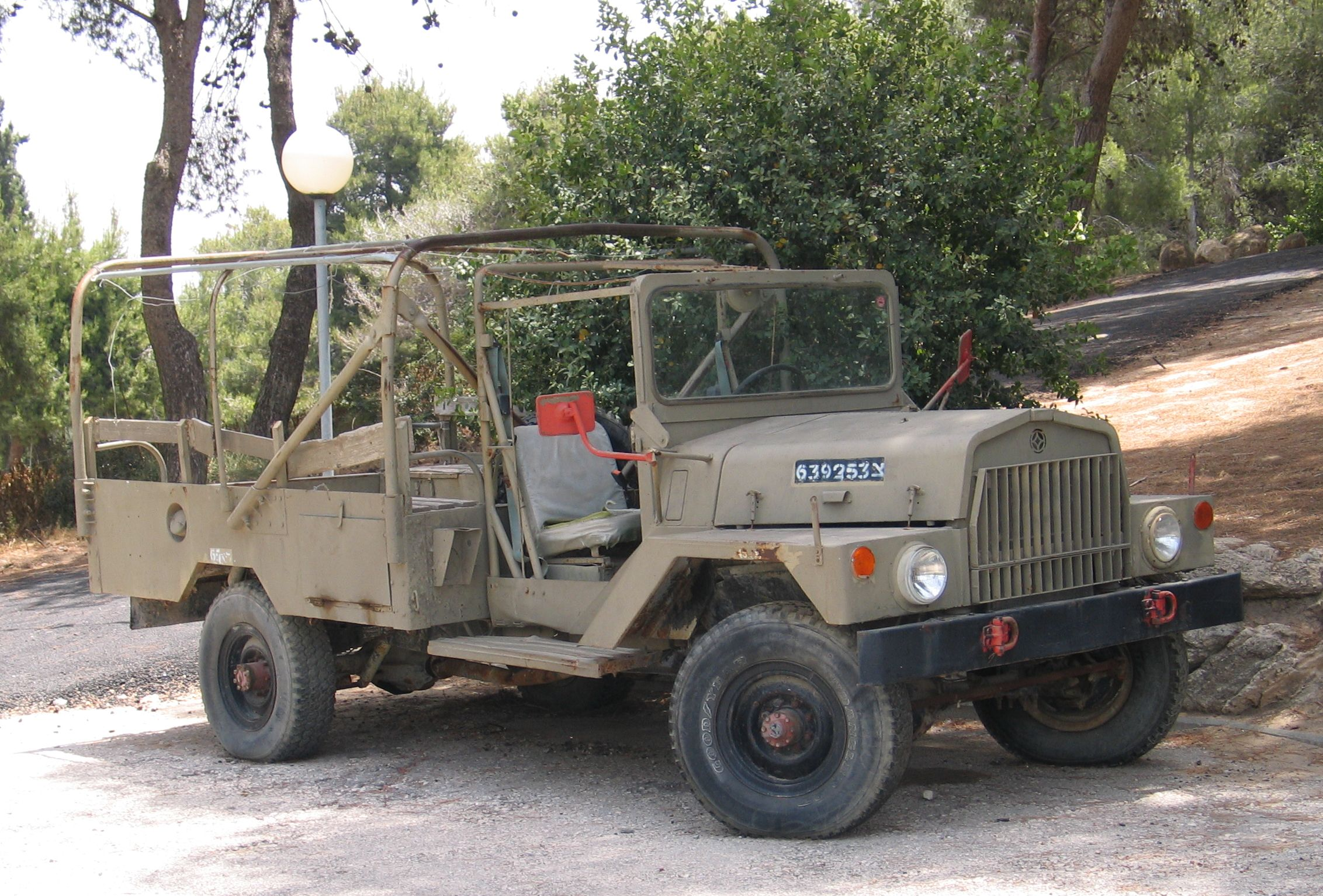

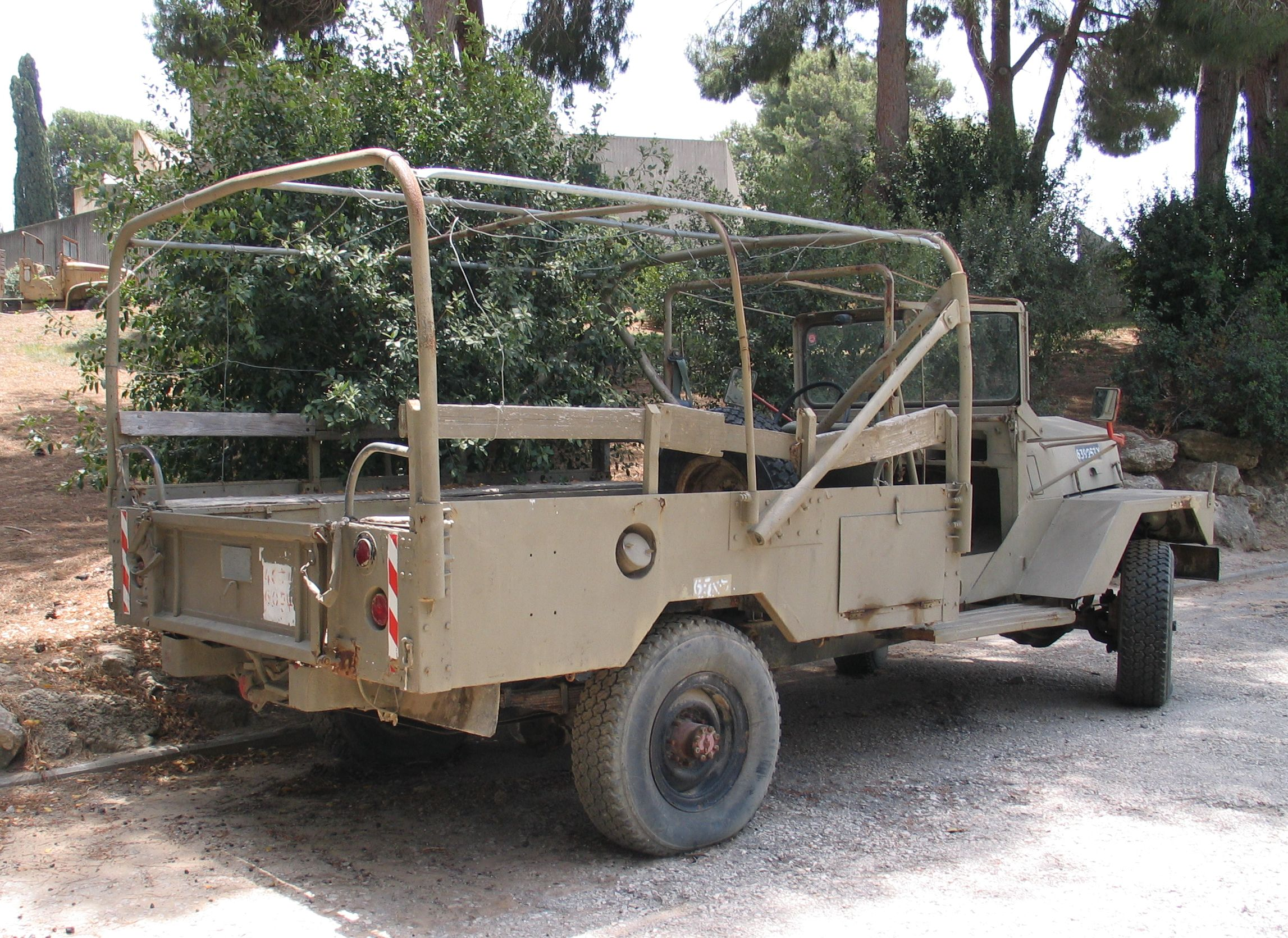

== Service ==
=== Israeli Defence Forces ===
The AIL M325 Command Cars replaced Dodge Power Wagons in the Israeli defence force in the mid-1970s. The Israeli Defence Forces have since replaced the M325 with a more modern version, the M462 ABIR. Boxier-looking, they are powered by a 6.2 liter V8 diesel engine and NP435 manual gearbox, or Turbo 400, or 450 automatic gearbox. This M462 is still built on what is basically a 1947 Dodge Power Wagon chassis.

=== Botswana Defence Force ===
In the late 1980s and early 1990s the Botswana Defence Force was supplied with M325 Command Cars – patrol trucks as well as Cargo A and B versions. Botswana Defence Force personnel heavily favoured the M325s, being reliable, easy to maintain and almost unstoppable in difficult going. Today the M325 is being phased out of the Botswana Defence Force, being replaced by French ACMATs.

=== Other militaries ===
The AIL M325 was also exported to and used in service in several other countries, including Nicaragua, Chile, Peru, Kenya and Lebanon. Israel supplied the armed militias of the South Lebanon Army (SLA) and Lebanese Forces (LF) with M325s in the early 1980s, and since the end of the civil war in 1990, use of M325s was continued by the Lebanese Armed Forces.

== Operators ==
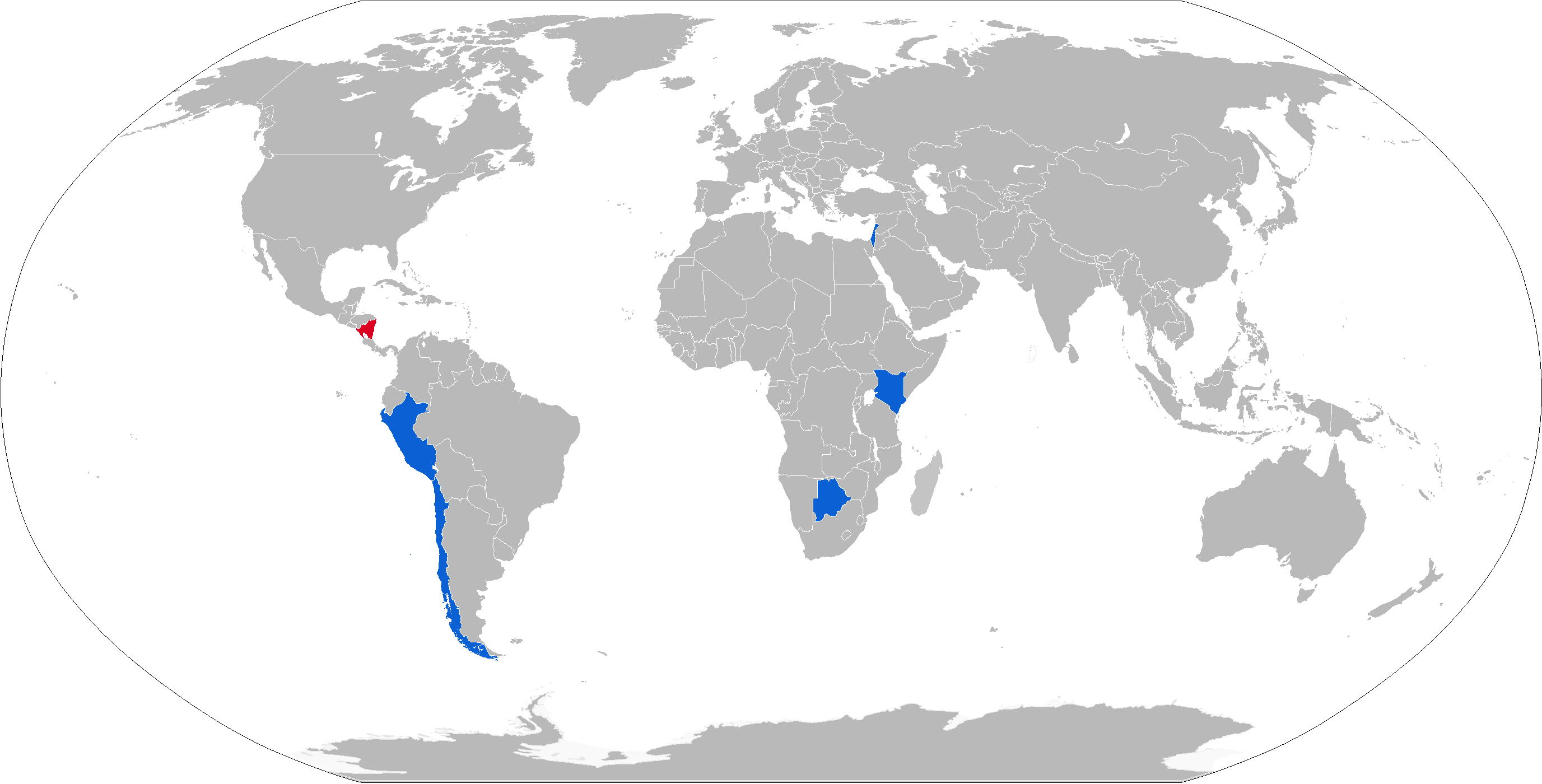
Map with M352 operators in blue

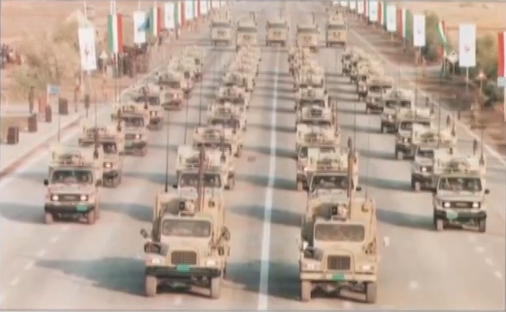
AIL M325 cars used by People's Mojahedin Organization of Iran during a parade in 1991.

=== Current operators ===
- Botswana – Botswana Defence Force
- Chile – Chilean Army
- Kenya – Kenyan Army
- Lebanon – Lebanese Armed Forces
- Peru – Peruvian Army

=== Former operators ===
- Iran
- Israeli Defense Forces (Until 2013)
- Lebanese Forces (militia) (1978–1993)
- National Guard of Nicaragua (1977–79)
- People's Liberation Army (Lebanon) (1983–1990)
- People's Mojahedin Organization of Iran
- South Lebanon Army (1978–2000)

== See also ==
- AIL Abir
- AIL Storm
- Golan Armored Vehicle
- Guardium
- Humvee
- MDT David
- Military light utility vehicle
- Plasan Sand Cat
- Wolf Armoured Vehicle
