= AIL Abir =

Israeli 4x4 military vehicle

M462
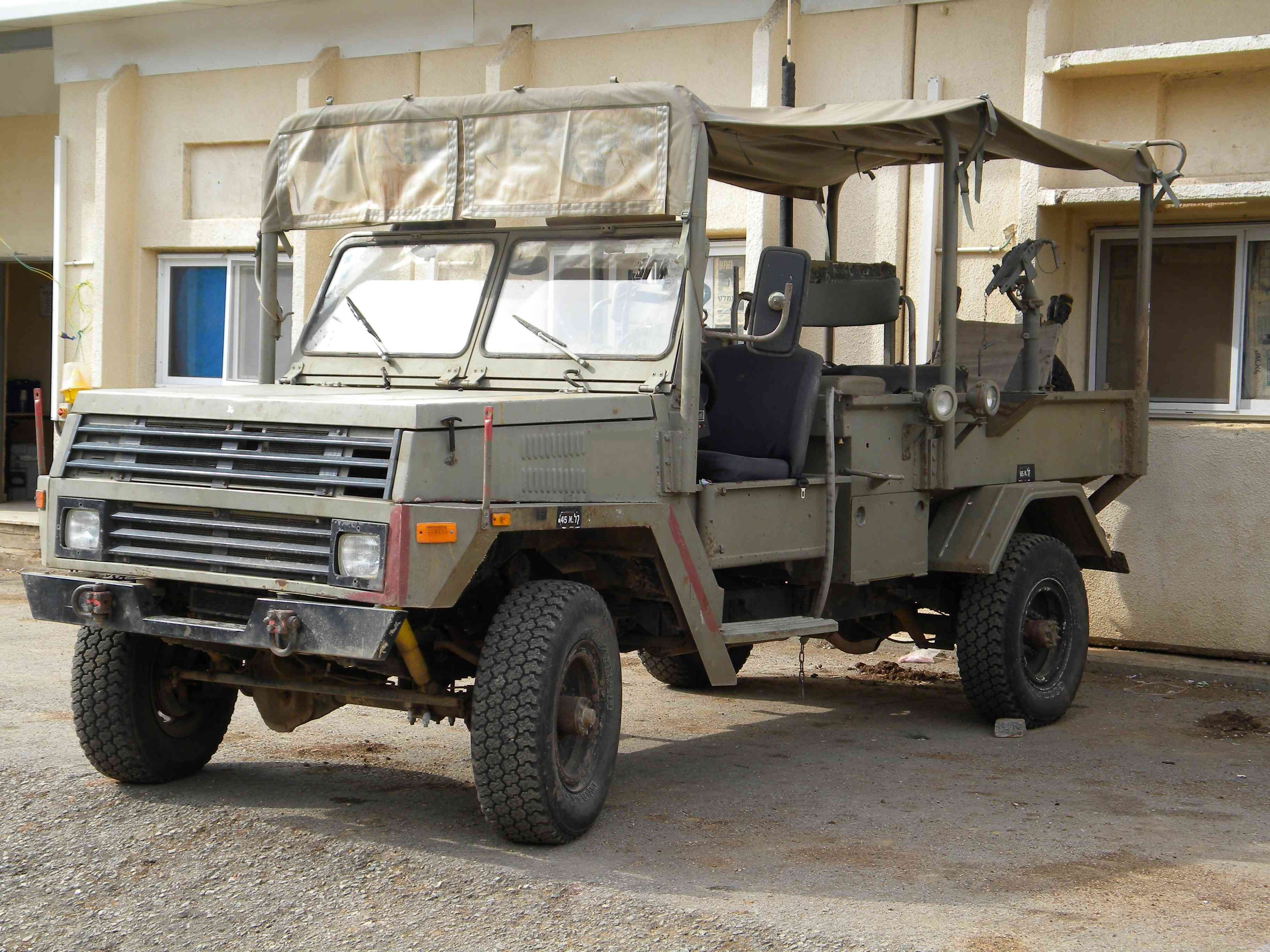

Overview
- Manufacturer: Automotive Industries Limited
- Production: 1966–1987

Body and chassis
- Class: multipurpose high-performance 4x4 military vehicle

The M462 Abir (English: "Knight") is a 4x4 military vehicle in service with the Israel Defense Forces, developed by Automotive Industries Ltd. to serve as a replacement for the M325.

== Specifications ==
The M462 can carry 13 troops or a cargo of 1800 kg. The M462 can be fitted with one forward machine gun and a side machine gun.

== Variants ==
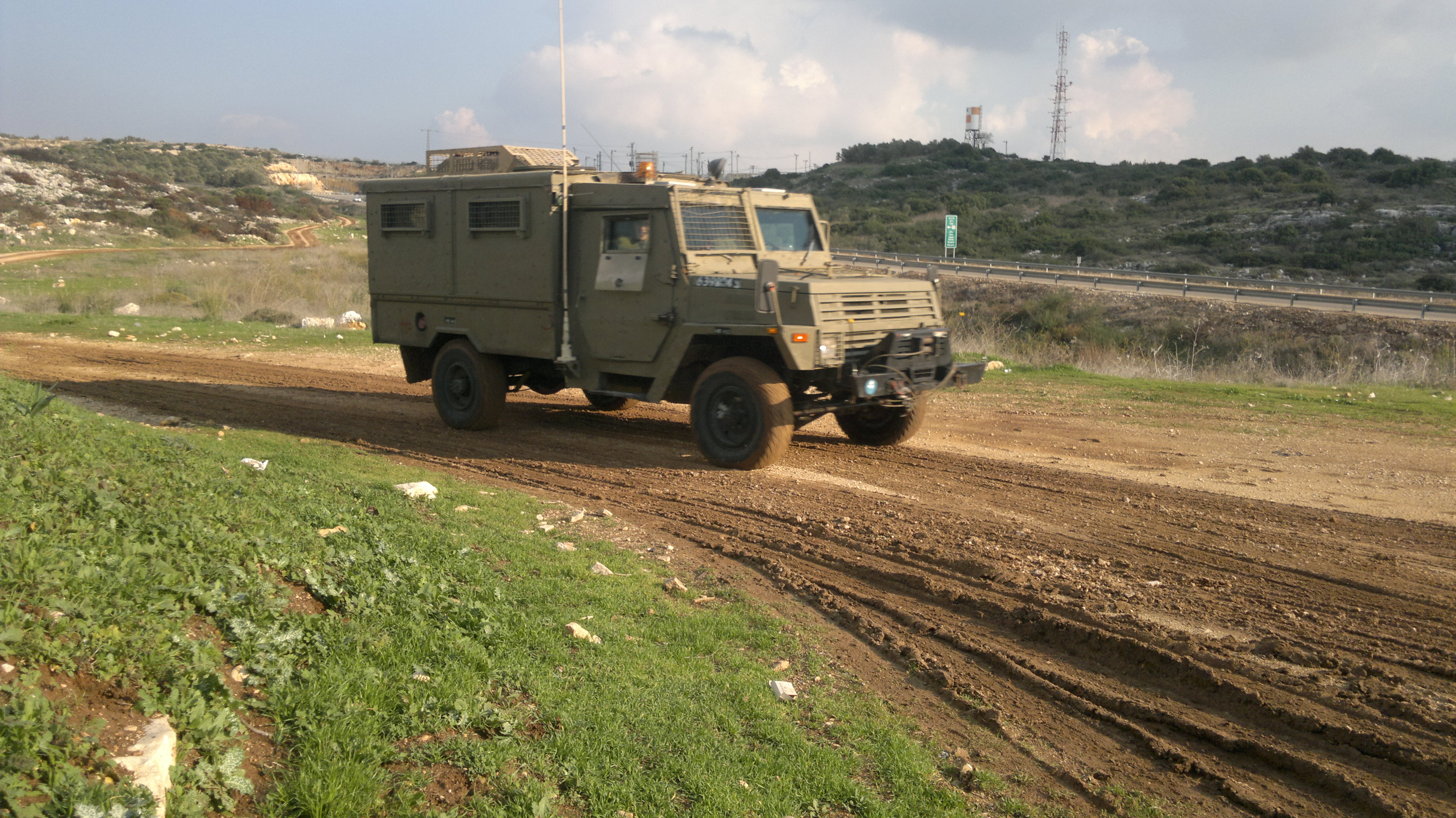
Abir Rhino APC

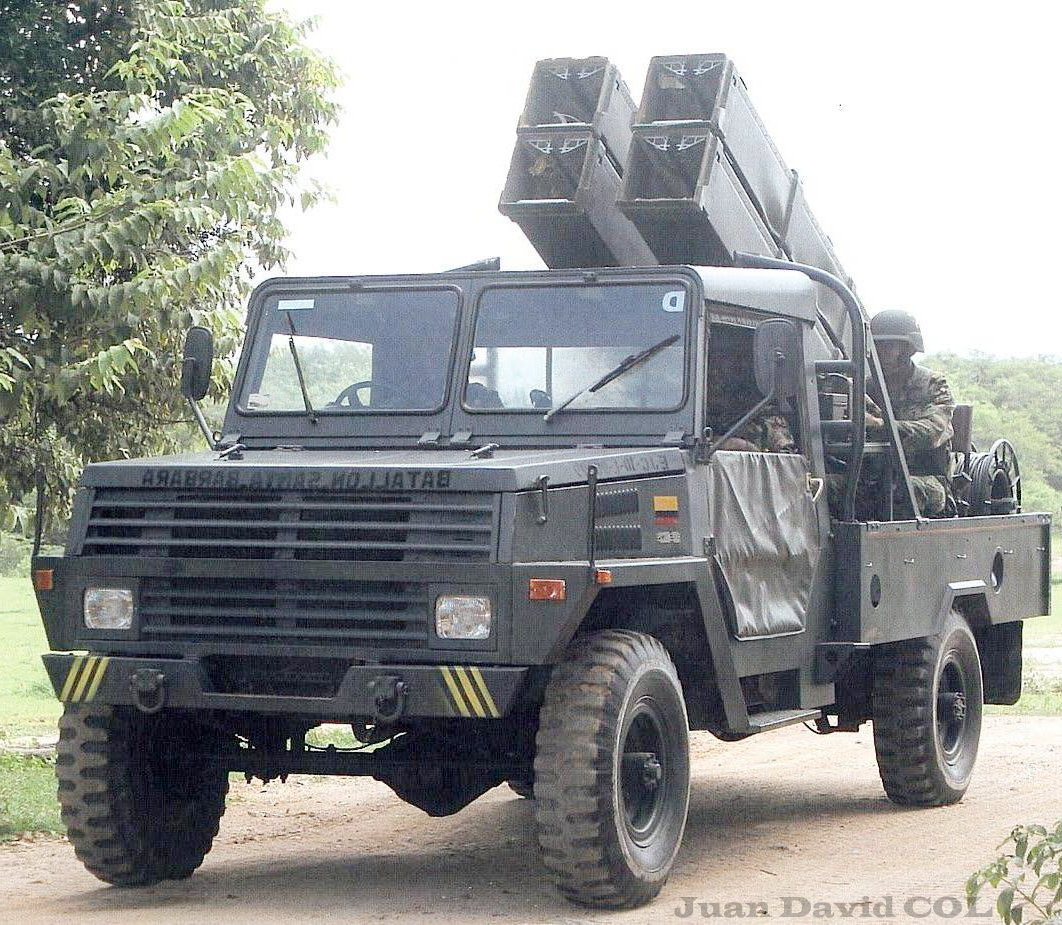
Nimrod anti-tank system.

- M462 Abir: standard model.
- M462 ATGM Portee: with BGM-71 TOW.
- M462 M40A2 Portee: with M40A2 106mm recoilless rifle.
- M462 Rhino: a 4x4 armoured vehicle based on the M462, used for high-risk area patrol, riot control, special operations, and command post.
- M462 Fire: bush fire engine.
- M462 Ambulance: military ambulance, 4 litter cases or 8 sitting patients.
- Anti-tank: armed with two Nimrod anti-tank missile pods

== Operators ==
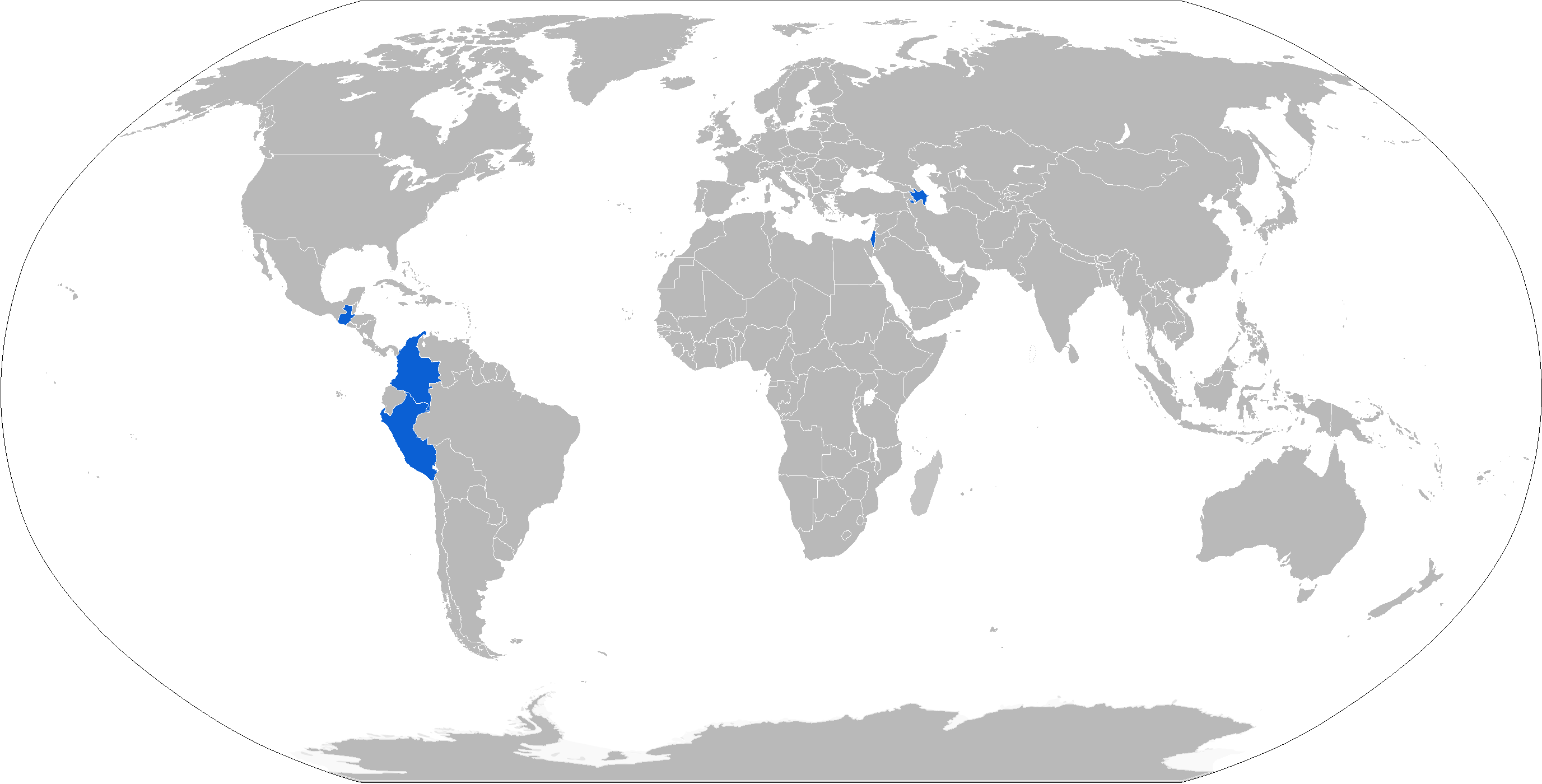
Map with Abir operators in blue

=== Current operators ===
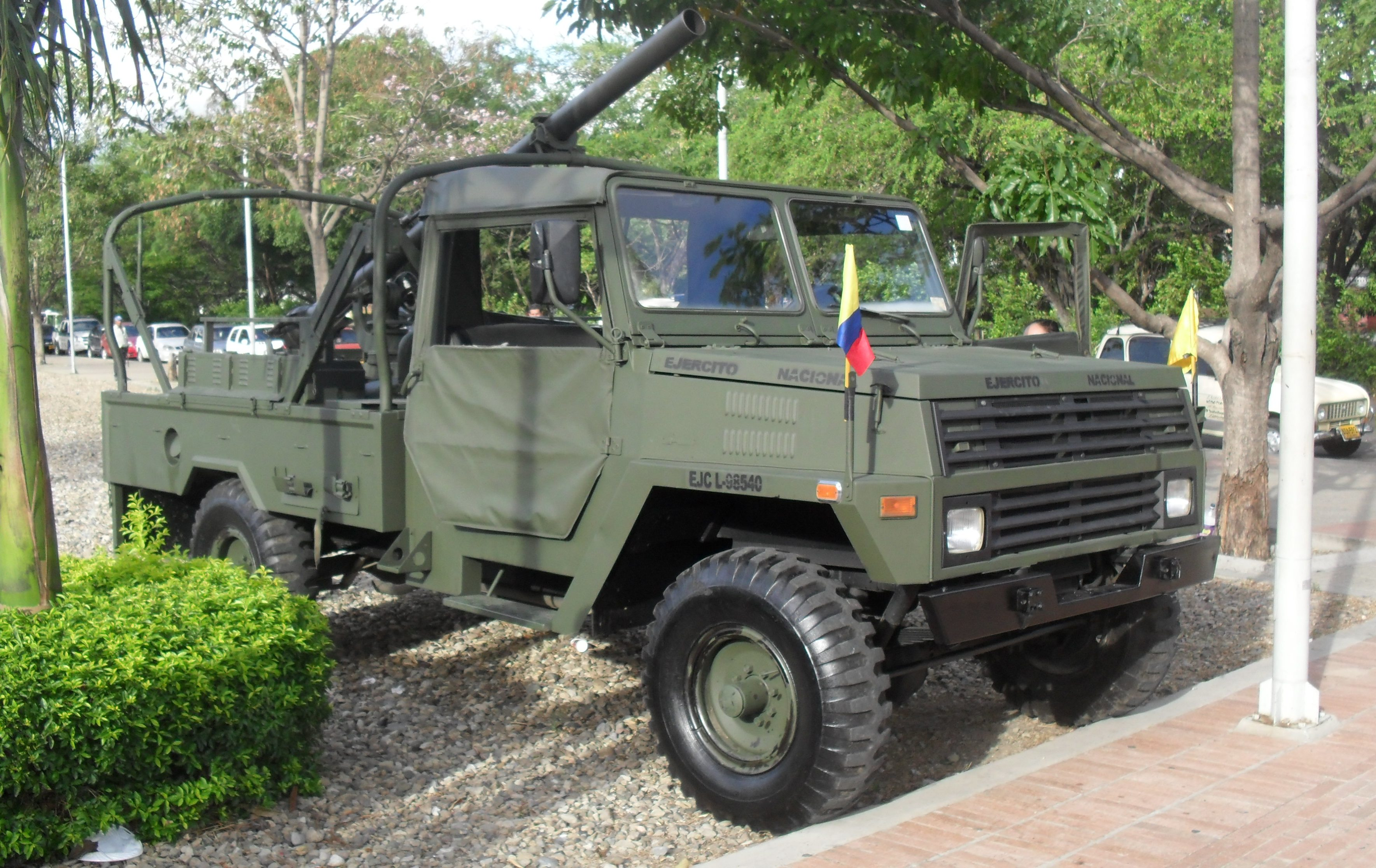
Colombian Army AIL Abir.

=== Actual ===
- Azerbaijan
- Colombia
- Peru
- Guatemala

=== Former ===
- Israel
