= France–Israel relations =

- France: Israel

Diplomatic mission
- Embassy of France, Tel Aviv: Embassy of Israel, Paris

France–Israel relations are the bilateral ties between the French Republic and the State of Israel. In the early 1950s, the two countries maintained close political and military ties. France was Israel's main weapons supplier until the French withdrawal from Algeria in 1962. Three days before the outbreak of the Six-Day War in 1967, the government of Charles de Gaulle imposed an arms embargo on the region, mostly affecting Israel.

Under François Mitterrand in the early 1980s, bilateral relations improved greatly. Mitterrand was the first French president to visit Israel while in office. After Jacques Chirac was elected as president in 1995, France's relationship with Israel declined due to his support for Yasser Arafat during the first stages of the Second Intifada. After being elected as president in May 2007, Nicolas Sarkozy said that he would refuse to greet any world leader who does not recognize Israel's right to exist. Relations continued to warm since 2017, under the presidency of Emmanuel Macron. However, Macron said that he stopped the flow of French military aid to Israel during the Gaza war and encouraged others to do so in a conference on 5 October 2024.

== Background ==
=== 1800s ===
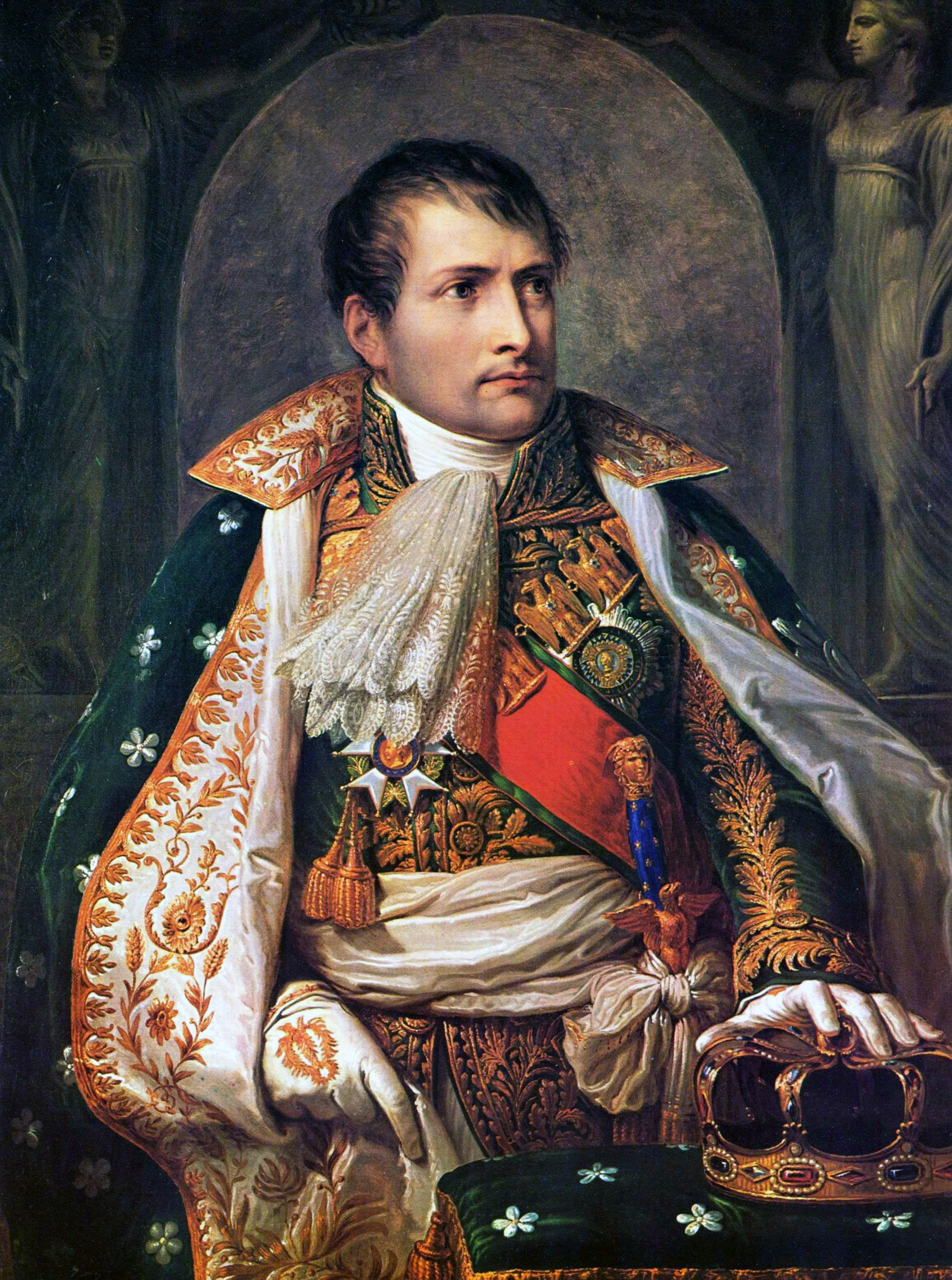
French Emperor Napoleon, who was widely revered by Jewish people as a savior for his tolerance

Napoleon, the first and second Emperor of the First French Empire, declared emancipation by his decree allowing Jews to be free to worship their religion and prohibit any kind of persecution on Jewish people, and he obtained the title as a liberator. He remains highly respected by Jews even after the establishment of Israel.

=== 1900s ===
The Dreyfus affair between 1894 and 1906 was the first and rather bitter connection between the Zionist Movement and France. The ousting of a Jewish French officer in a modern European state motivated Theodor Herzl in organizing the First Zionist Congress and pledging for a home for the Jews in 1897. During the fourth Zionist Congress in London in 1900, Herzl said in his speech there that "...there is no necessity for justifying the holding the Congress in London. England is one of the last remaining places on earth where there is freedom from anti-Jewish hatred." While the British Government began to recognize the importance and validity of the Zionist movement, the French remained absent. Bonds between the Zionist Movement and France strengthened during Germany's occupation of France in World War II due to the common German enemy.

The 1922 census of Palestine lists 716 French speakers in Mandatory Palestine (3 in the Southern District, 497 in Jerusalem-Jaffa, 3 in Samaria, and 213 in the Northern District), including 715 in municipal areas (261 in Jerusalem, 70 in Jaffa, 123 in Haifa, 2 in Gaza, 1 in Hebron, 120 in Nablus, 72 in Nazareth, 2 in Ramleh, 6 in Tiberias, 46 in Bethlehem, 3 in Acre, 4 in Ramallah, 2 in Beit Jala, and 3 in Shafa 'Amr).

== History ==
=== 1940s–1960s ===
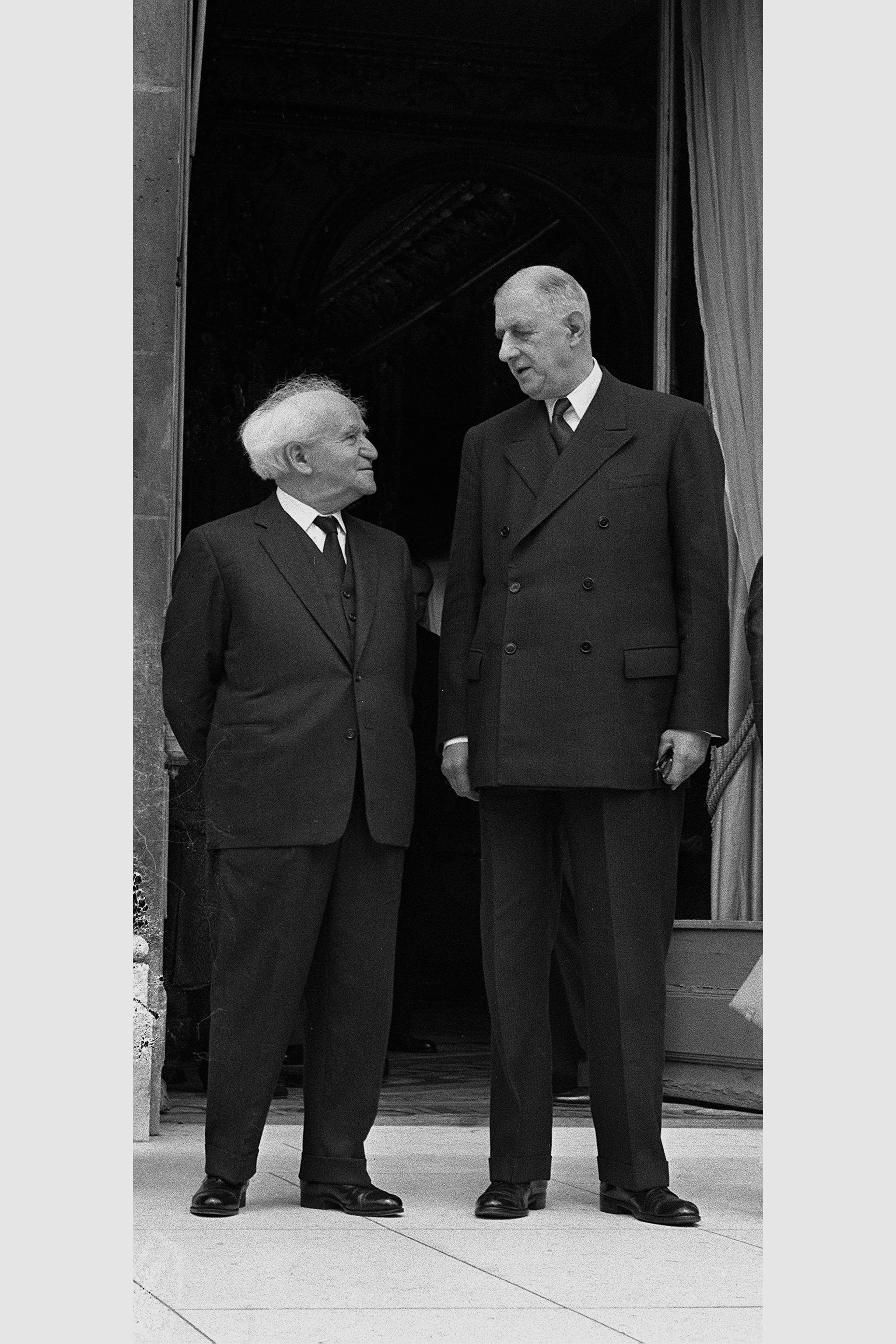
June 14, 1960, first meeting between David Ben-Gurion and Charles de Gaulle at Élysée Palace

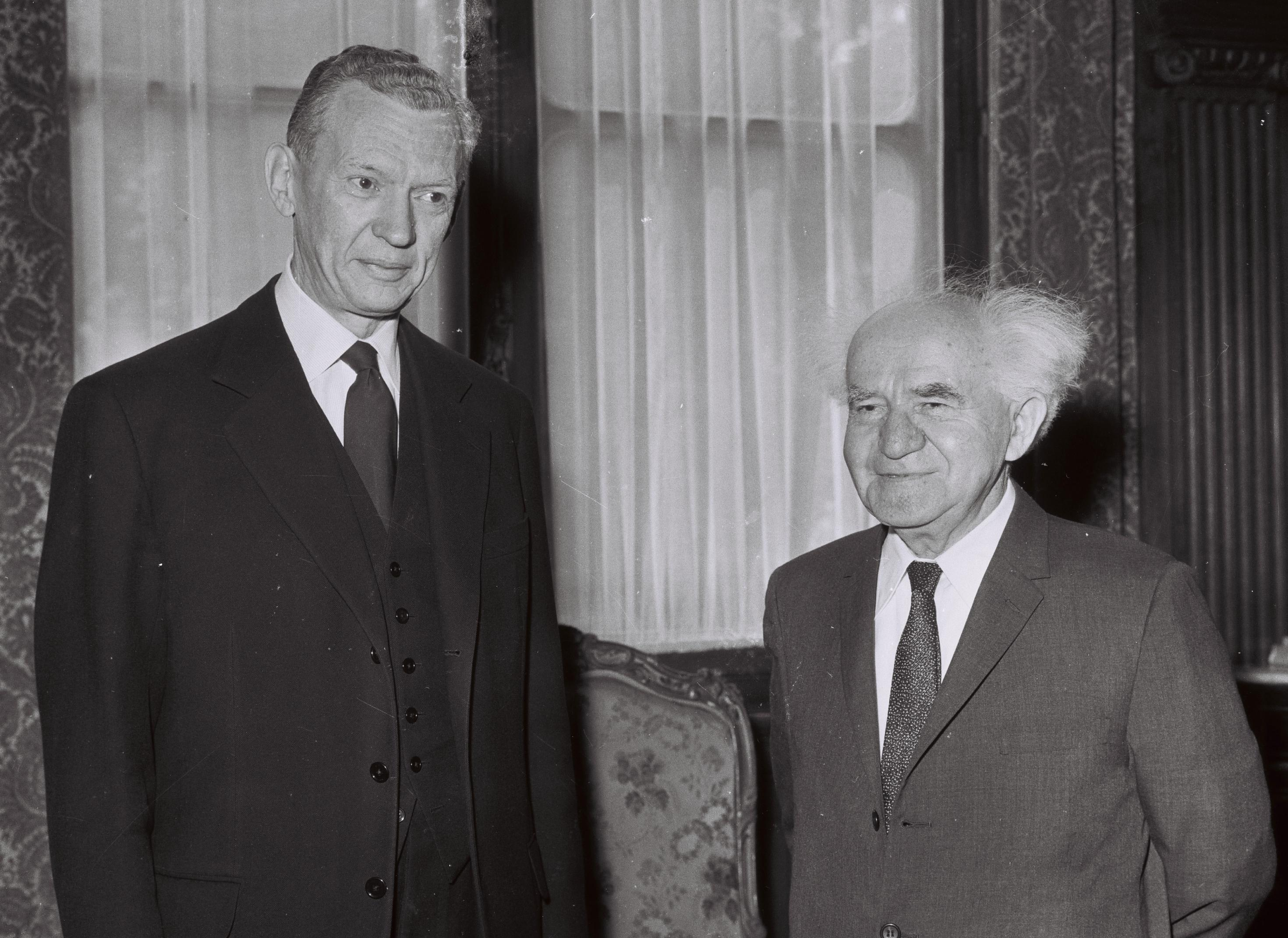
French foreign minister Maurice Couve de Murville with Ben-Gurion

I had forecast that once the Algerian War was over, France would drop Israel like a hot coal and renew its ties with the Arab world. And that, of course, is exactly what happened – Israel adopted the US instead.

— Uri Avnery

After France's liberation by Allied forces, David Ben-Gurion was confident that Charles de Gaulle would assist him in the founding of a Jewish state. On 12 January 1949 France recognized the existence of Israel and supported the decision for Israel to join the United Nations. In 1953 France started selling French weapons to Israel and became one of its closest allies and supporters. France then shared with Israel a strategic interest against radical Arab nationalism, as it had to cope with nationalist sentiment in its Algerian territories. During the late 1950s France supplied Israel with the Mirage - Israel's most advanced aircraft to date and their first cutting edge combat aircraft.

In October 1957 an agreement was signed between France and Israel about the construction of the nuclear power plant in Israel, which was completed in 1963. Future Israeli President Shimon Peres was the politician who brokered the deal. In Michael Karpin's 2001 documentary A Bomb in the Basement, Abel Thomas, chief of political staff for France's defense minister at the time said Francis Perrin, head of the French Atomic Energy Commission, advised then-Prime Minister Guy Mollet that Israel should be provided with a nuclear bomb. According to the documentary, France provided Israel with a nuclear reactor and staff to set it up in Israel together with enriched uranium and the means to produce plutonium in exchange for support in the Suez War.

The Suez Crisis of 1956 marked a watershed for Israeli-French relations. Israel, France and the United Kingdom had conspired for control of the Suez Canal. Israel initiated a surprise invasion of Egypt, followed by the United Kingdom and France. The aims were to regain Western control of the Suez Canal and to remove Egyptian President Gamal Abdel Nasser from power, as well as reopening the Straits of Tiran to Israeli shipping and stop Egyptian-sponsored fedayeen raids into Israel. After the fighting had started, the United States, the Soviet Union, and the United Nations forced Britain and France to withdraw. Israel held the canal until the establishment of UNEF, which reopened the Straits of Tiran to Israel.

In 1960, Ben-Gurion arrived in France for Israel's first official visit. In the 1960s, with the expulsion of France from North Africa completed in 1962, the shared strategic interest against Arab nationalism dissipated, leading France to take a more conciliatory attitude toward the Arab nations and a correspondingly harsher tone toward Israel. Work on the nuclear reactor, however, continued with French help.

=== France's arms embargo of 1967 ===
France imposed an arms embargo on Israel before the beginning of the Six-Day War. After the embargo the Israeli Air Force was severely limited in long-term strategic planning and capability, as the embargo caused a shortage in spare parts for most of Israel's French fighter aircraft, which were highly advanced at the time. According to The New York Times, "this double game, however, ended when the Six-Day War in 1967 forced France to pick a side. In a shock to its Israeli allies, it chose the Arab states: despite aggressive moves by Egypt, France imposed a temporary arms embargo on the region — which mostly hurt Israel — and warned senior Israeli officials to avoid hostilities."

The change of sides impaired as well the French-American relationship, as France was seen as an increasingly outdated and aggressive neocolonial power. The USA started to assume its current role as an ally of Israel with the Six-Day War in 1967, while France decided to take sides with the Arab world to improve its relations after the independence of Algeria.

Until the Six-Day War, France was the main supplier of Israel's weapons. Just before the Six-Day War in June 1967, Charles de Gaulle's government imposed an arms embargo on the region, mostly affecting Israel. In 1969, de Gaulle retired and Israel hoped that new president Georges Pompidou would bring about better relations, but Pompidou continued the weapons embargo, straining the relations once again.

=== 1970s–1990s ===
In 1981 François Mitterrand was elected 21st President of the French Republic. Mitterrand was the first left-wing head of state since 1957 and was considered a friend of the Jewish people and a lover of the Bible. In 1982 he visited Israel and spoke in the Israeli parliament, the Knesset.

Both Israel and France deployed their armed forces to Lebanon during the Lebanese Civil War.

=== 2000s ===
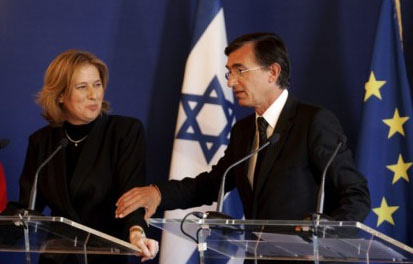
Tzipi Livni and French FM Douste-Blazy, 2006

In 2006 French exports to Israel rose to €683 million ($1.06 billion). France is Israel's 11th-greatest supplier of goods and represents Israel's ninth-largest market. France's main export items are motor vehicles, plastics, organic chemicals, aeronautical and space engineering products, perfumes and cosmetics. The second-largest percentage of tourists that visit Israel come from France.

On February 13, 2008, French president Nicolas Sarkozy spoke at the annual dinner of the French Jewish CRIF (Conseil Représentatif des Institutions juives de France). The address was seen as a sign of newfound warmth between France's Élysée Palace and French Jewry, whose place in French society has been shaken in recent years following a surge in antisemitic attacks. "Israel can count on a new dynamic to its relationship with the European Union", said Sarkozy. "France will never compromise on Israel's security."

Israel welcomed Sarkozy's tough stance against the Iran-backed Hamas and Iran-backed Hezbollah. During the 2006 Lebanon War, France played a key role in Europe's efforts to get a quick ceasefire.

On 30 June 2009, Sarkozy urged Israeli Prime Minister Benjamin Netanyahu to dismiss Israeli Foreign Minister Avigdor Lieberman from his post, saying "You have to get rid of that man. You need to remove him from this position."

=== 2010s ===
In January 2016 French Foreign Minister Laurent Fabius announced that France would convene an international conference with the objective of enabling new Israeli-Palestinian peace talks. He said, however, that if these talks were unsuccessful, then France would recognize a Palestinian state. Israeli officials rejected what was considered an ultimatum, while Israeli opposition leaders said the French threat to recognize Palestine was triggered by the current Israeli government's failed diplomacy. France had yet to recognize Palestine.

=== 2020s ===
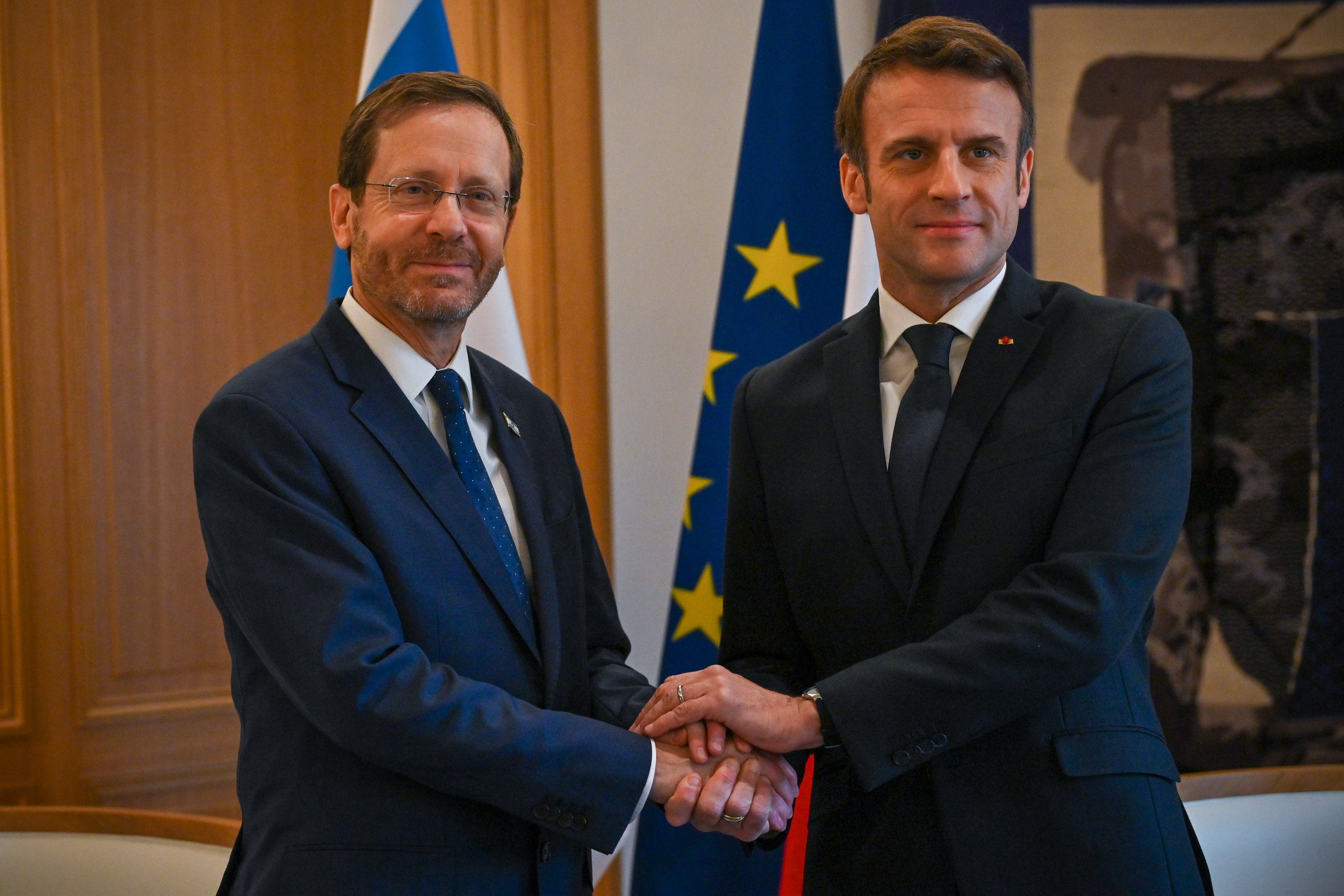
French President Emmanuel Macron with Israeli President Isaac Herzog, 2022

As the Turkish–French rift increased following French President Emmanuel Macron's criticism of Islamist terrorism, Turkish President Recep Tayyip Erdoğan compared the treatment of Muslims in Europe to Nazi treatment of Jews in World War II. This statement was condemned by Israel, which pointed out the Turkish government's lack of solidarity following the murder of French teacher Samuel Paty and accused the Turkish government of misrepresenting the situation. It further described the differences between Nazi policy in World War II and the French response to terrorism. Israel and France, along with Russia, Saudi Arabia, the United Arab Emirates, Greece, Cyprus and Egypt, have also recently worked against Turkey on various fronts from its treatment of Kurds to the conflicts in Libya and the Syrian civil war.

In 2020, Macron argued that anti-Zionism was a form of antisemitism, elaborating that it "doesn't mean it becomes impossible to have disagreements, to criticize this or that action by the Israeli government, but negating its existence today is clearly a contemporary form of anti-Semitism".

In October 2023, French President Macron condemned Hamas' actions during the Gaza war, and expressed his support for Israel and its right to self-defense.

In a speech in May 2024, then-French Prime Minister Gabriel Attal defended Israel and its actions in Gaza. He also criticized Israel's opponents, calling opposition to Israel antisemitic, and said that he considered French society to be incomplete without Jews.

On 15 June 2024, France banned Israeli defence companies from exhibiting at the Eurosatory arms fair over the latter's war in Gaza. The Jerusalem Post reported that the District Court in France also prohibited "any Israeli citizen or intermediary of an Israeli business".

On 17 June 2024 according to the Israeli Defense Minister Yoav Gallant, "France does not stand by Israel against attacks and murders by Hamas." He stated that Israel is not ready for France to participate in the attempts to reach a settlement between Israel and Hezbollah.

In a conference on 5 October 2024, Macron said that he had stopped the flow of French military aid to Israel during the Gaza war and encouraged other leaders to join his arms embargo. Netanyahu said that Macron's call was a disgrace.

In November 2024, France argued that the International Criminal Court's (ICC) arrest warrants for Israeli leaders are not valid because Israel is not a member of the ICC.

In May 2025, France, along with the United Kingdom and Canada, issued a joint statement condemning Israel's "egregious" actions in Gaza. They warned of the possibility of "further concrete actions" if Israel continued its military offensive and failed to lift restrictions on humanitarian aid.

Following Macron's decision to recognize the State of Palestine, Charles Kushner, the US ambassador to France, said that Macron's commitment had exacerbated antisemitic incidents in France. Macron added that he will not open an embassy in the State of Palestine until hostages held in Gaza are released and a truce is in place.

On 28 August 2025, E3 members, France, Germany, and the United Kingdom, initiated the process to impose "snapback" UN sanctions against Iran, stating that despite upholding their own commitments, since 2019 Iran had "increasingly and deliberately ceased performing its JCPOA commitments", including "the accumulation of a highly enriched uranium stockpile which lacks any credible civilian justification and is unprecedented for a state without a nuclear weapons program".

On 28 September 2025, UN sanctions were officially reimposed on Iran.

On 29 January 2026, France supported listing Iran's IRGC as a terrorist organization in EU terrorism list.

On 31 March 2026, it was announced that Israel was ceasing defense procurement from France, with Major General Amir Baram citing the policy as part of a broader effort to reduce cooperation with countries Israel assessed as having acted against it, and with the Jerusalem Post reporting that Macron's decision to bar United States military aircraft active in the 2026 Iran war from French airspace as “the straw that broke the camel's back".

== Cultural, scientific and technical cooperation ==
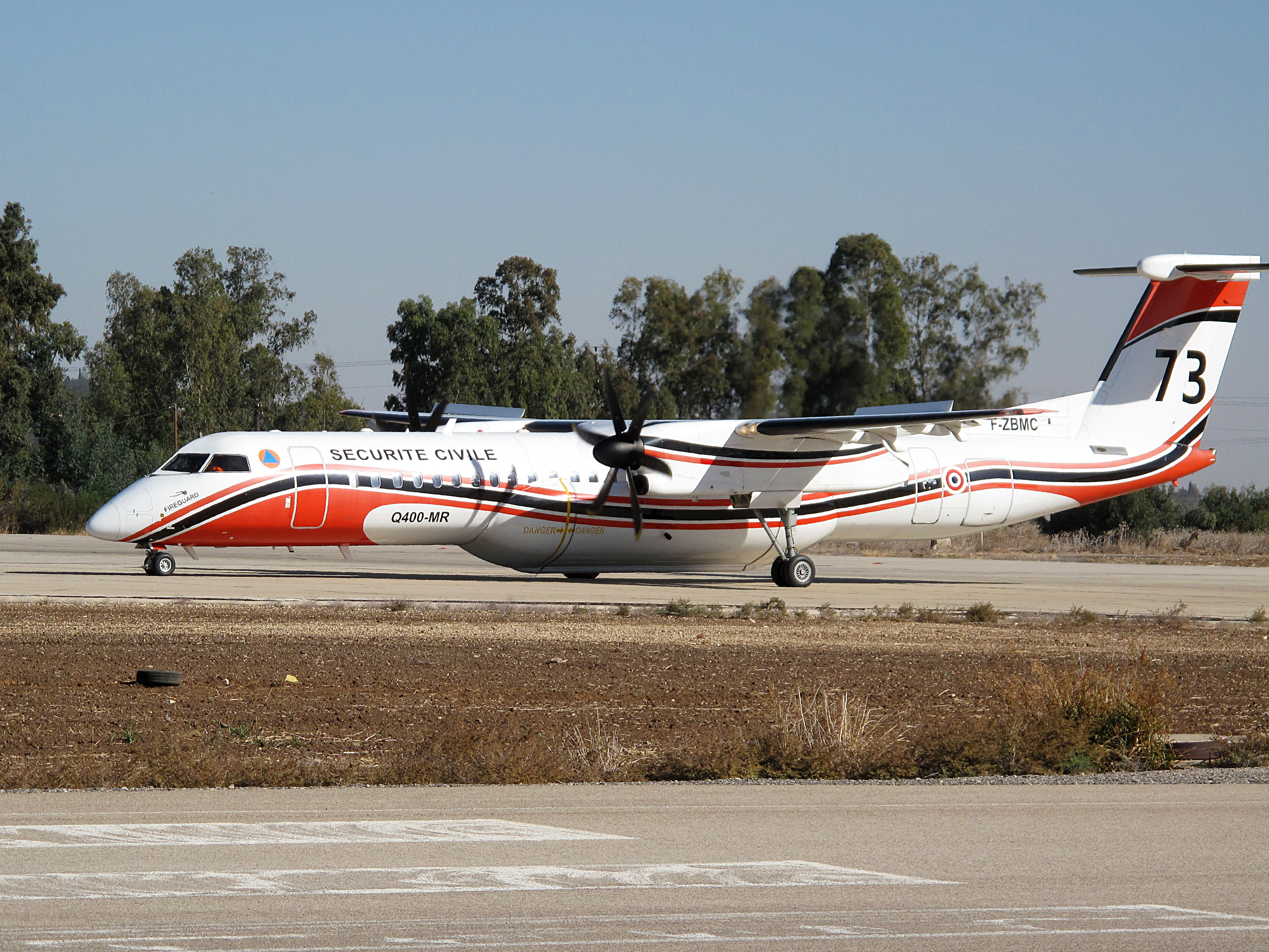
A French fire fighting plane (Bombardier Dash-8) preparing for takeoff in northern Israel

France's cultural, technological and scientific cooperation with Israel is based on bilateral agreements that date back to 1959.

In June 2007 a new French Institute opened in Tel Aviv. In honor of Israel's 60th anniversary of its independence, Israel was the official guest at the annual Book Fair in Paris in March 2008.

Since 2004, network research programs have been launched in medical genetics, mathematics, medical and biological imaging, as well as bioinformatics, with nearly 100 researchers involved in each. New programs are expected to be introduced in the areas of genomics, cancer research, neuroscience, astrophysics and robotics.

As part of the French culinary festival "So French, So Good," 12 respected French chefs visited Israel in February 2013 to work with Israeli chefs and hold master classes.

== Public opinion ==
According to a 2025 Pew Research Center survey, 28% of people in France had a favorable view of Israel, while 63% had an unfavorable view; 17% had confidence in Israeli Prime Minister Benjamin Netanyahu, while 77% did not.

== Resident diplomatic missions ==
- France has an embassy in Tel Aviv and a consulate-general in Haifa.
- Israel has an embassy in Paris and a consulate-general in Marseille.
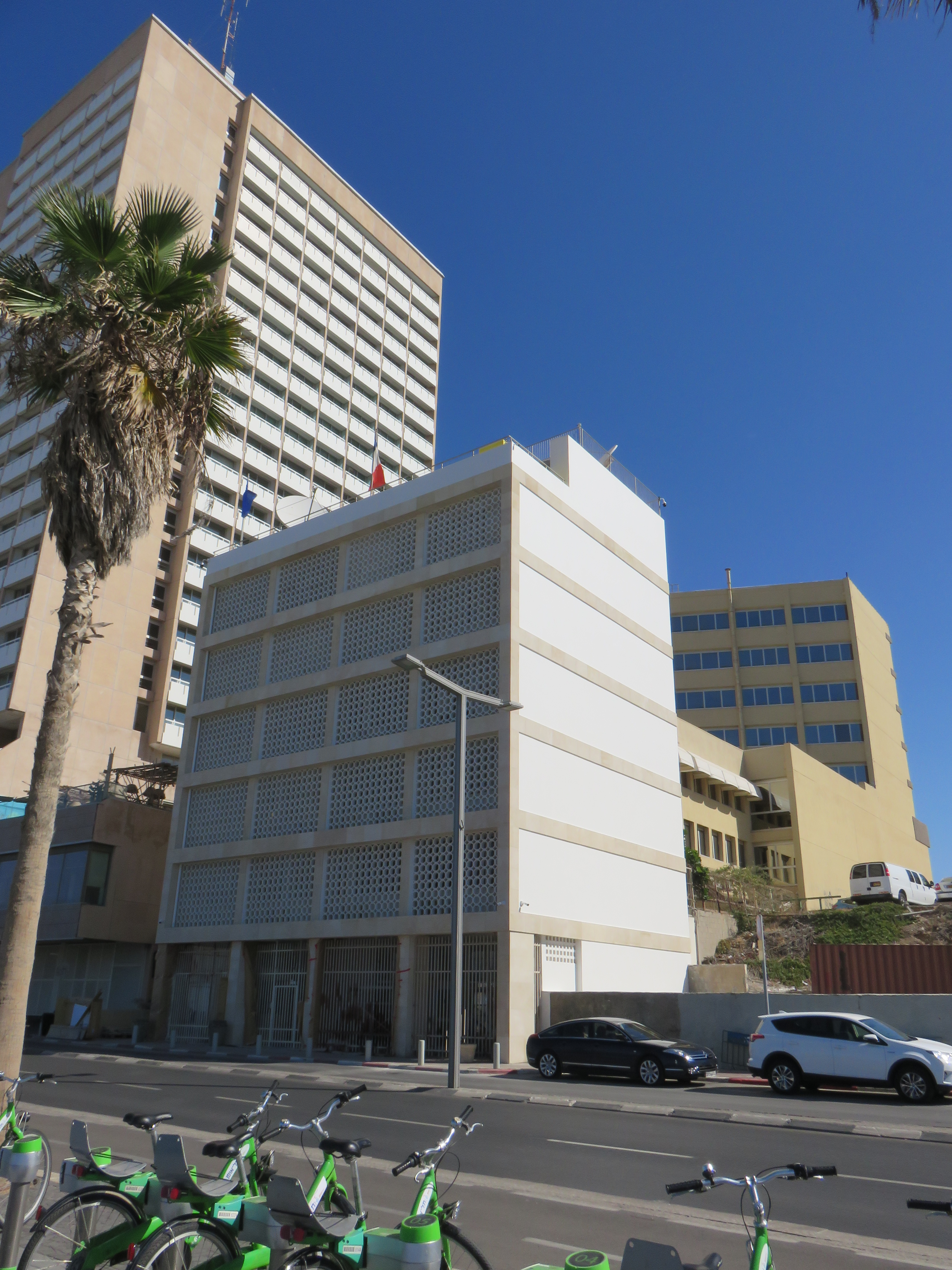
Embassy of France in Tel Aviv

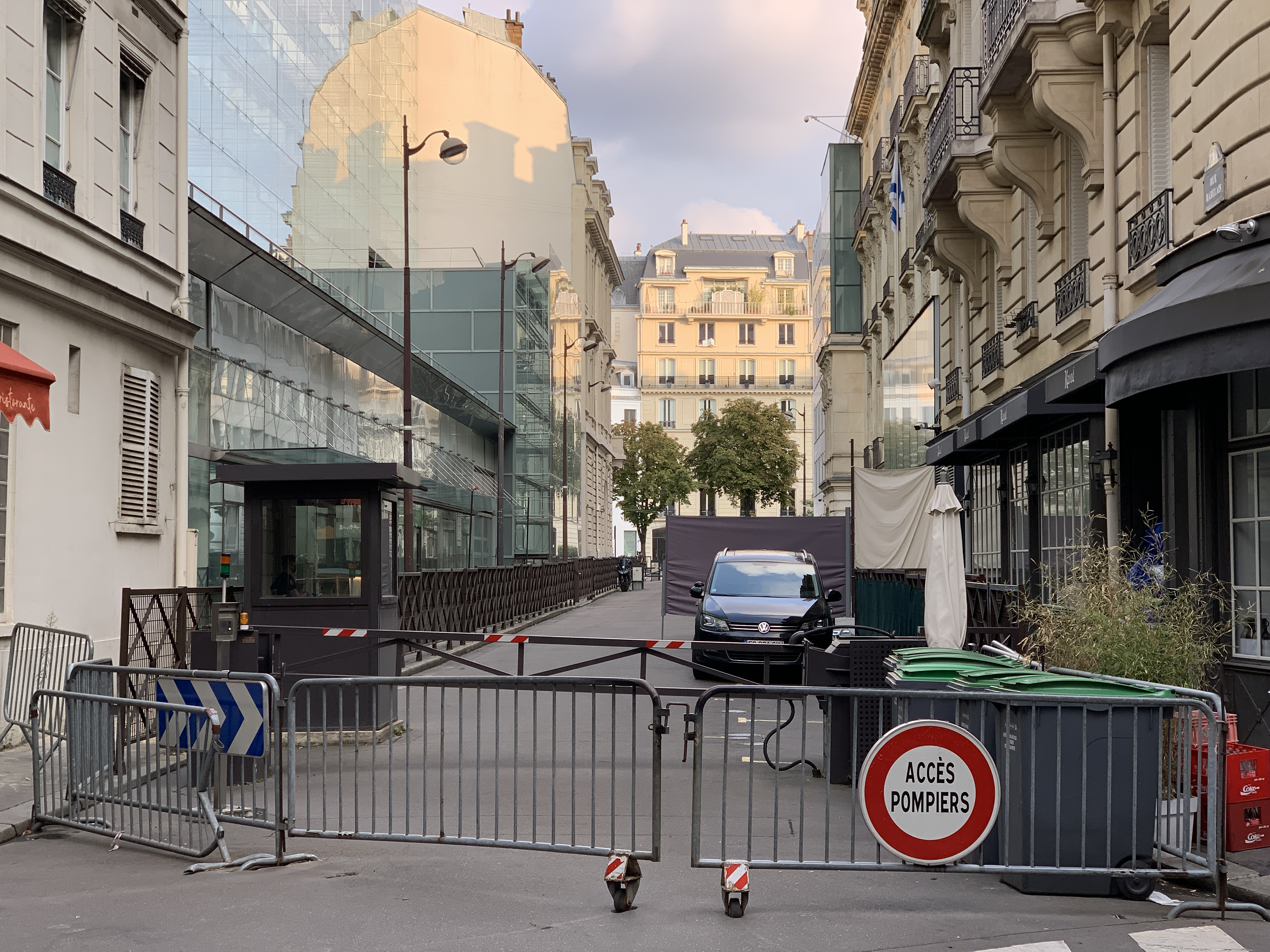
Embassy of Israel in Paris

== See also ==
- Antisemitism in France
- Dreyfus affair
- International recognition of Israel
- Foreign relations of Vichy France
- History of the Jews in France
- French Jews in Israel
- Napoleon and the Jews
