= Embassy of Israel, Paris =

Israeli diplomatic mission in France

שגרירות ישראל בצרפת Embassy of Israel in France
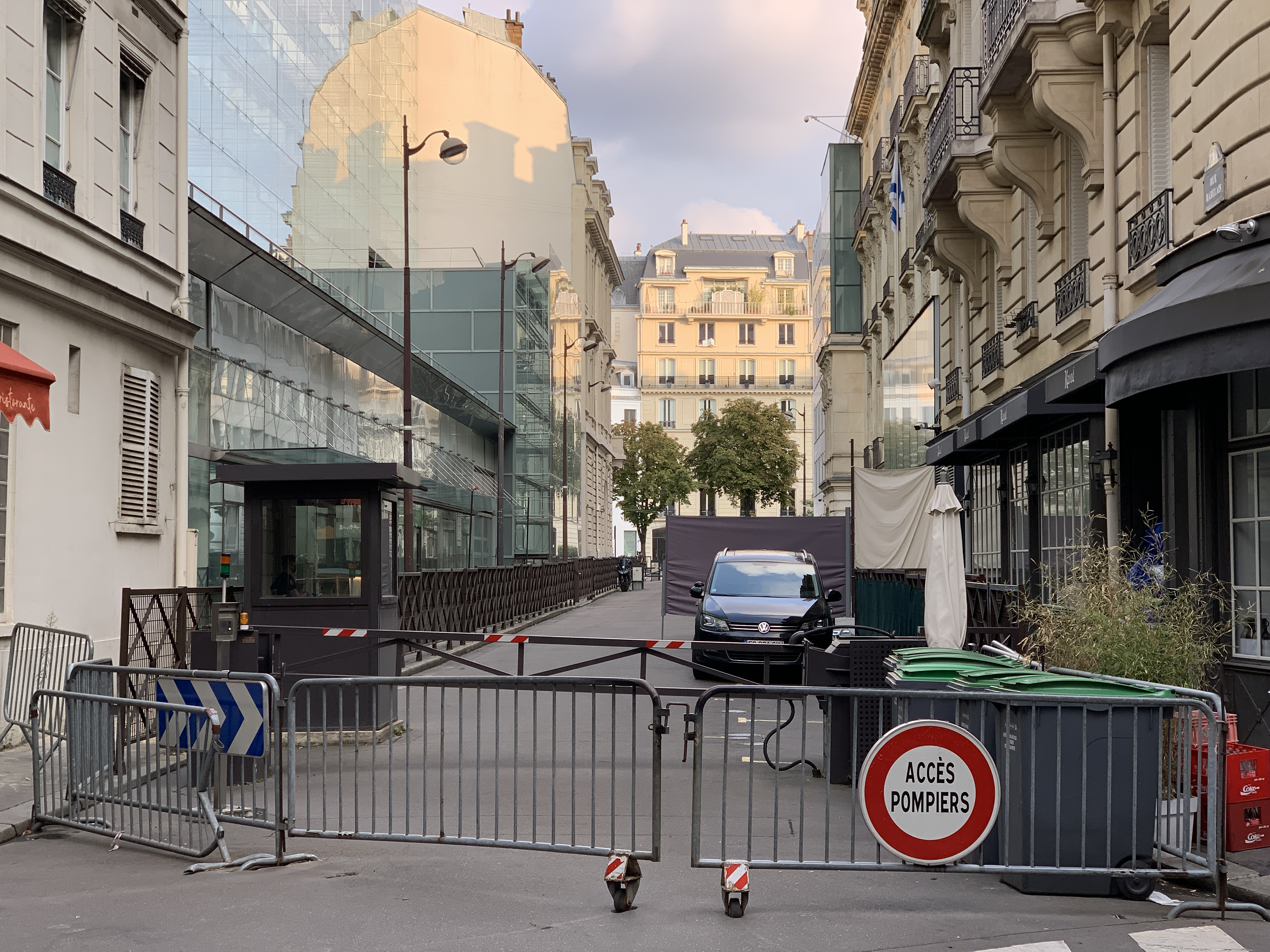
- Location: Paris, France
- Address: 3 Rabelais street, Paris, 75008
- Ambassador: Joshua Zarka

The Embassy of Israel in Paris is the diplomatic mission of Israel in France.

== History ==
The embassy has been based at its current address since 1973; it was previously located at 143 Avenue de Wagram, in the 17th arrondissement of Paris.

On May 23, 2002, a large part of the embassy was destroyed by an accidental fire, following which the premises were completely renovated, the walls of the offices being made of Jerusalem stone. The renovation was carried out by architects David Knafo and Tagit Klimor.

== See also ==
- Israel–France relations
