= Countries supplying arms to Israel =

Israel, while possessing a robust domestic defense industry, relies significantly on foreign arms imports, particularly for advanced aircraft, missiles, and key military technologies.

During the Gaza war that began in October 2023, the supply of arms to Israel has been a subject of significant international attention and debate. The United States is the largest supplier of military equipment to Israel, accounting for approximately 69% of Israel's major conventional arms imports between 2019 and 2023. U.S. military assistance includes advanced aircraft, precision-guided munitions, missile defense systems such as the Iron Dome, and other defense technologies. Germany is the second-largest supplier, responsible for about 30% of Israel's arms imports in the same period. German exports have included air defense components, ammunition, and technology for weapons development. While some German arms exports were temporarily paused in 2024 due to legal challenges, deliveries resumed later that year.

== United States ==
Since its founding, Israel has received approximately $310 billion (inflation-adjusted) in total economic and military aid from the United States, making it the largest cumulative recipient of US foreign aid. According to a Stockholm International Peace Research Institute (SIPRI) report, the United States is the main supplier of armaments to Israel, accounting for 69% of Israel's major conventional arms imports between 2019 and 2023.

In 2016, the United States and Israel signed their third 10-year Memorandum of Understanding on military aid, committing to provide $38 billion in support through the year 2028, marking a historic agreement between the two nations. This includes $33 billion in foreign military aid and an additional $5 billion designated for missile defense. Israel used this aid to finance orders for 75 F-35 joint strike fighters and other stealth aircraft. It has used missile defense programs, including the jointly developed Iron Dome, Arrow, and David's Sling missile systems.

In addition, the United States provides Israel with a range of military equipment, including small-diameter bombs, JDAM kits for converting unguided bombs into GPS-guided weapons, advanced CH-53 heavy-lift helicopters, and KC-46 aerial refueling tankers. Specifically, Israel acquired laser-guided missiles for its Apache gunship fleet, as well as 155mm shells, night-vision devices, bunker-buster munitions, and new army vehicles. The United States also provides high-level military consultancy to Israel.

== Germany ==
According to SIPRI, Germany is one of the main suppliers of armaments to Israel, accounting for 30% of Israel's arms imports between 2019 and 2023. According to a Federal Ministry for Economic Cooperation and Development (BMZ) report, Germany's defense exports to Israel worth about $353 million have so far increased by almost 10 times from the previous year. The Deutsche Presse-Agentur (DPA) reported, that Germany supplies components of air defense systems and communication equipment to Israel. The arms exported included 3,000 portable anti-tank weapons and 500,000 rounds of ammunition for automatic or semi-automatic firearms. Most of the export licenses were granted for land vehicles and technology for the development, assembly, maintenance, and repair of weapons. In August 2025, the German government announced that it had suspended all arms exports to Israel for use in Gaza. On 24 November 2025, arms exports to Israel were resumed following the ceasefire in the Gaza war.

== Italy ==
According to SIPRI, Italy is among Israel's top three armaments suppliers, along with the US and Germany, making up 1% of Israel's arms imports from 2019 to 2023. The annual sale of arms and ammunition to Israel amounted to €13.7 million, according to the magazine Altreconomia, which cited the Italian National Institute of Statistics (ISTAT). Italy's exports to Israel include helicopters and naval artillery. Italy's government offered assurances that it was honoring previous contracts and reviewed sales on a case-by-case basis in order to adhere to a law prohibiting sales of munitions to countries at war, or those accused of human rights violations. In October 2024, the Italian government announced that it had suspended all shipments of military equipment to Israel.

== United Kingdom ==
The total value of UK exports to Israel is unclear. In 2022, UK-approved arms export licenses to Israel were worth $52.5 million, but 10 "open" licenses were also issued with an unlimited value, the actual value of the open licenses being unclear. Between the 7 October Hamas-led attack on Israel and 31 May, according to government statistics, Britain issued more than 108 arms export licenses, to Israel. The non-profit group Campaign Against Arms Trade has calculated that £574 million worth of arms export licenses have been granted to Israel since 2008, but this figure does not account for the value of open licenses. According to the Campaign Against Arms Trade, BAE Systems, the largest defense contractor in Europe and the seventh-largest in the world, provides about 15% of the components of the F-35 stealth combat aircraft used by Israel in the recent bombing of Gaza.

In December 2023, the Palestinian human rights organization Al-Haq and the UK-based Global Legal Action Network launched a legal challenge over the UK's role in arms sales to Israel, calling on the UK to stop granting licenses for arms exports to Israel, after their written requests to suspend arms sales after the 7 October attack were ignored. Later, Britain's two premier human rights organizations, Amnesty International and Human Rights Watch, joined the campaign. Calls for an end to arms sales to Israel heightened after three British citizens were killed in the World Central Kitchen aid convoy attack by Israel in central Gaza.

== Canada ==
In late January 2024, Canadian Prime Minister Justin Trudeau admitted that Canada had authorized military exports to Israel after the October 7 attacks and the commencement of the Gaza war. According to Al Jazeera, the Canadian government had approved at least $21 million in new licenses for military exports to Israel during the early months of the war. Some of the products sold to Israel included bombs, torpedoes, rockets, and other explosive devices, along with the related equipment and accessories. On 5 March 2024, Human rights and pro-Palestinian advocates in Canada filed a lawsuit against the federal government to block companies from exporting military goods and technology to Israel.

Despite official denials, weapons shipments have still been sent to Israel post January 2024. These include $78.8 million worth of artillery propellants and a $37.2 million authorization of military exports in February 2025.

== India ==
According to Indian news channel TV9 Hindi, the Indian government delivered several Hermes 900 drones known as "killer" to Israel on an unspecified date by Adani-Elbit Advanced Systems India to help Israel's needs in the Gaza war. According to the Al Jazeera reports citing leaked European Parliament documents, India exported rockets and explosives to Israel during the Gaza war. Videos of the remains of a missile after Israel bombed the UN shelter in Nuseirat refugee camp, show that some of its components were made in India.

On 2 April 2024, citing marine tracking sites, the Indian cargo vessel Borkum, left Chennai in south-eastern India and circumnavigated Africa to avoid the Red Sea crisis. On 15 May 2024, the Borkum's location off the coast of Spain, a short distance from Cartagena, sparked pro-Palestine protests who wanted an inspection of the ship. Also, a group of leftist politicians sent a letter to the Spanish president, Pedro Sánchez, asking him to prevent the ship from docking. Before Spanish authorities could take a stand, Borkum canceled its planned stop and continued to the Slovenian port of Koper. Identification codes identified in documents released by the Palestine Solidarity Campaign, Borkum contained 20 tonnes of rocket engines, 12.5 tonnes of rockets with explosive charges, 1,500kg (3,300 pounds) of explosive substances, and 740kg (1,630 pounds) of charges and propellants for cannons.

== See also ==
- List of military aid to Israel during the Gaza war
- List of companies involved in the Gaza war
- Arms embargoes on Israel
- Israeli Americans
- Israel Weapon Industries
- Military equipment of Israel
