= List of military aid to Israel during the Gaza war =

This is a list of known military aid and military sales to Israel during the Gaza war. This list includes delivered equipment, training, intelligence, treatment of soldiers, logistical support as well as financial support to the Israeli government.

== List ==
Military aid was coordinated throughout the war, at monthly meetings of Israel's Defense Coordination Group. The United States has been a major contributor to Israel providing significant military aid.

=== Australia ===
In 2025, the Albanese government was criticized for supplying parts for F-35 fighter jets to the global supply chain that can be accessed by Israel. Greens senator David Shoebridge said: "If the Albanese government stopped the export of F-35 fighter jet parts to Israel, then their F-35 fleet would be grounded."

=== Austria ===
In 2024, Austria approved the export of more than €1 million in arms to Israel.

=== Canada ===
Prime Minister Justin Trudeau said in late January 2024 that Canada had authorized military exports to Israel in the early stage of the Gaza war and the government approved at least $21 million in new licenses for military exports to Israel in the early months of the war. Canada has not approved any additional exports since January 2024. Some of the products sold include bombs, torpedoes, rockets, other explosive devices and charges, and related equipment and accessories. In August 2024, the United States agreed to a $20 billion arms sale to Israel, which included $60 million worth of Canadian-manufactured munitions. (Note: In response to these reports, the Government of Canada said it would not comment on the U.S. sale and stated it had "not approved new arms export permits to Israel" since January 2024.)

In July 2025, data uncovered from entries in the database of the Israel Tax Authority showed that Canadian goods continued to enter Israel, described by the Israeli government as military weapon parts and ammunition. Details of 2025 imports from Canadian companies included bullets and other military hardware of a kind that the Canadian government previously stated could not be shipped to Israel under the current arms ban.

=== Czech Republic ===
Czech arms exports to Israel doubled between 2022 and 2024 under Prime Minister Petr Fiala. In September 2025, the Italian port of Ravenna blocked the shipment of weapons to Israel, which likely originated from the Czech Republic.

=== Denmark ===
In April 2025, Denmark was criticized for exporting weapons components for Israeli F-35 fighter jets.

=== France ===
In late October 2023, 100,000 rounds of machine gun ammunition were supplied to Israel by France.

On 5 October 2024, Emmanuel Macron said that he stopped the flow of French weaponry to Israel and encouraged others to do so.

=== Germany ===
Germany is one of the major arms suppliers to Israel. It supplied 326.5 million euros ($353.7m) in equipment and weapons to Israel in 2023. The Chancellor of Germany, Olaf Scholz, decided to send two IAI Heron TP type UAVs of the German Army. It was also announced that Germany would supply about ten thousand tank shells to Israel. According to the Federal Ministry for Economic Cooperation and Development (BMZ) Germany supplies components of air defense systems and communication equipment to Israel. The arms exported included 3,000 portable anti-tank weapons and 500,000 rounds of ammunition for automatic or semi-automatic firearms. Most of the export licenses were granted for land vehicles and technology for the development, assembly, maintenance, and repair of weapons. In September 2024, a Reuters report found that arms exports to Israel from Germany had slowed in 2024, due to legal challenges. In October 2024, however, data from the German Foreign Ministry showed it had authorized $100 million in military exports in the prior three months. Between August and October 2024, Germany sold weapons worth 94 million euros to Israel. In October 2024, CDU leader Friedrich Merz successfully urged the German government to resume weapons deliveries to Israel, including spare parts for tanks. In August 2025, the German government announced that it had suspended all arms exports to Israel for use in Gaza.

=== India ===
India has reportedly been exporting rockets, drones like Elbit Hermes 900, explosives and other military equipment to Israel during the Gaza war. A cargo ship, laden with over 30 tons of such supplies intended for the Israeli Defense Forces, was reported off the coast of Spain. This ship, which had set sail from southeastern India, was en route to Ashdod. However, Spain refused to give the ship a port call.

=== Italy ===
From October to December 2023, Italy had exported €2.1 million ($2.30 million) in weaponry and ammunition to Israel. In October 2024, the Italian government announced that it had suspended all shipments of military equipment to Israel.

=== Netherlands ===
The Netherlands initially allowed the export of parts for the F-35, but a Dutch court ruling later banned all such exports. It was subsequently reported that Dutch-made parts continued to arrive in Israel via the United States.

=== Romania ===
In 2024, Romania exported €24.2 million in arms and ammunition to Israel, making it the EU's second-largest exporter after the Czech Republic. In November 2023, Elbit Systems announced the opening of an ATMOS 2000 factory in Romania.

=== Serbia ===
In 2024, Serbia's state-owned arms trader had sold €42.3 million worth of weapons to Israel, mostly 155 mm artillery shells. In June 2025, the Serbian president, Aleksandar Vučić, announced that he had halted all arms transfers to Israel.

=== Slovakia ===
In 2024, Slovakia stopped releasing data on its arms exports to Israel; Amnesty International Slovakia condemned this action. According to Eurostat data, Slovakia exported €10.4 million in arms and ammunition to Israel in 2024.

=== United Kingdom ===
The UK government does not give weapons directly to Israel but rather issues licenses for British companies to sell weapons. British companies supply less than 1% of Israel's military imports. Israel used British-supplied weapons and equipment in the war. About 15% of components of each Israeli-owned F-35 fighter jet are made by British companies, including BAE Systems. According to the UK government, British military exports to Israel amounted to £18 million in 2023.

=== United States ===
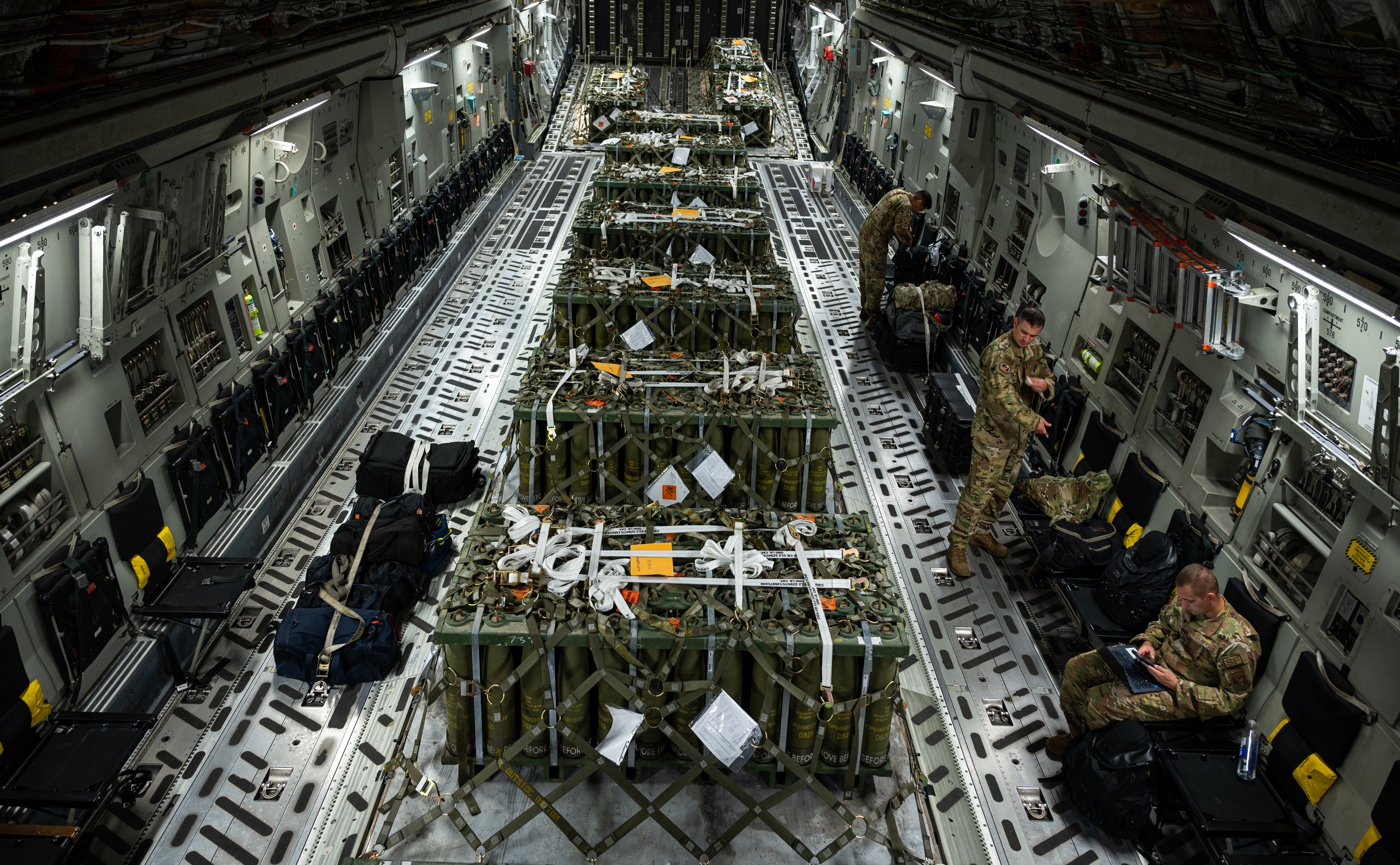
U.S. Air Force Airmen prepare for departure a C-17 Globemaster III carrying ammunition to Israel, 15 October 2023, at Ramstein Air Base, Germany.

On 7 October 2023, hours after the start of the Gaza war, the United States started sending warships and warplanes into the region, prepared to give Israel whatever it needs. Israel asked the United States for Iron Dome interceptors, and President Joe Biden said Washington would quickly provide additional equipment and resources, including ammunition, which are going to reach Israel within days. US Secretary of State Antony Blinken said Washington would provide its "full support" to Israel, with guided missile launchers and F-35 fighter jets among the equipment being sent. On 12 October, Biden administration started preparing an aid package of about $2 billion in additional funding to support Israel. On 14 October, the Pentagon had dispatched a small team of Special Operations personnel to Israel for intelligence gathering. On 15 October, the White House declared that it would attempt to get congressional approval of a fresh $2 billion weaponry aid package for Israel and Ukraine. By 17 October, five shipments of American weapons and equipment had arrived in Israel. On 20 October, Biden announced that the additional funds he asked Congress to authorize would come to a total of $14 billion, as part of a $105 billion military aid package that addressed Ukraine, Taiwan and Israel as well as US border security.

In November, a Republican plan was approved by the United States House of Representatives that allocated $14.5 billion in military aid for Israel.

By December US had supplied 15,000 bombs and 57,000 155mm artillery shells, mostly carried on C-17 military cargo planes. U.S. has also sent more than 5,000 unguided Mk82 bombs, more than 5,400 Mk84 bombs, about 1,000 small diameter GBU-39 bombs. On 8 December, Biden used emergency authority to skip congressional review to sell ~14,000 tank shells worth $106.5 million for immediate delivery to Israel. On 29 December, the United States government again used emergency authority to sell Israel artillery shells and related weapons worth 147.5 million dollars in order to replenish Israeli weapons stockpiles.

In February the Senate passed a $14 billion USD aid package for Israel.

By March US had approved more than 100 arms sales to Israel. Unnamed officials stated in March 2024 that the U.S. had signed off on an additional 1,800 MK84 2,000-pound bombs and 500 MK82 500-pound bombs. On 30 March, the White House authorized $2.5 billion in weapons transfers to Israel.

In April, Biden signed a $95bn security package which included around $17bn in military aid for Israel.

On 16 May, Biden notified Congress about a $1 billion arms sale to Israel. On 21 May, the U.S. House passed legislation that would slash the U.S. military budget unless Biden sent 3,500 heavy-duty bombs to Israel.

In June, the United States officially signed a Letter of Offer and Acceptance, allowing Israel to purchase 25 additional F-35 stealth fighter jets for $3 billion dollars. Also in June, Rep. Gregory Meeks and Sen. Ben Cardin signed off to an arms sale to Israel totaling $18 billion, after pressure from the Biden administration. In June 2024, two U.S. officials stated the United States had transferred ten thousand 2,000-pound bombs and thousands of Hellfire missiles to Israel since 7 October.

In July 2024, United States resumed shipments of the 500-pound bombs, which were halted in February over concerns about the humanitarian impact of Israel's use of them in killing Palestinians in Gaza.

On 9 August 2024, the Department of State said the United States would send Israel an additional $3.5 billion to spend on US-made weapons and military equipment. On 13 August 2024, the Department of State announced that the U.S. had approved a $20 billion weapons package sale to Israel, which included F-15 fighter jets and advanced air-to-air missiles.

In September 2024, the United States approved a $165 million sale of military tank trailers, including replacement parts, tool kits, and logistics support.

On 28 February 2025, President Trump approved a $3 billion arms sale to Israel, which included 35,500 MK 84 and BLU-117 and Mark 82 bombs and 4,000 Predator warheads. In September 2026 the Trump administration proposed a $2,8 billion arms delivery for Israel to congress leaders, consisting mostly out of 20,000 Mark 84 bombs, 20,000 BLU-117 bombs and 20,000 I-2000 penetrators. Although the delivery was labeled as a "sale", the supplies and their delivery are to be financed via the United States Foreign Military Financing program, Israel does not pay for them.

==== Local support ====
A June 2024 poll shows that about 70 percent of Democrats and 35 percent of Republicans support conditions on military aid to Israel, but the disconnect between what voters want and what the Biden administration did seemed to be widening by the time.

== See also ==
- Arms embargoes on Israel
- Impacts of the Gaza war#Arms transfers and embargoes
- List of companies involved in the Gaza war
- List of countries supplying arms to Israel
- Israel–United States military relations
