= Defense industry of Israel =

Sectoral overview

The defense industry of Israel is a strategically important sector and a large employer, as well as a major supplier of the Israel Defense Forces. The country is a large importer of military equipment, accounting for 2.1% of the world total in 2024. Three Israeli companies were listed on the 2022 Stockholm International Peace Research Institute index of the world's top 100 arms-producing and military service companies: Elbit Systems, Israel Aerospace Industries (including ELTA Systems), and RAFAEL.

Israel is also a major player in the global arms market with a 2.3% share of the global exports of major arms as of 2023. Total arms transfer agreements topped $12.9 billion between 2004 and 2011. There are over 150 active defense companies based in the country with combined revenues of more than $3.5 billion annually. Israeli defense equipment exports reached $7 billion in 2012, making it a 20 percent increase from the amount of defense-related exports in 2011.

With the 2022 Russian invasion of Ukraine, arms exports reached $12.5 billion in 2022. Much of the exports are sold to the United States and Europe. Other major regions that purchase Israeli defense equipment include Southeast Asia and Latin America. India is also major country for Israeli arms exports and has remained Israel's largest arms market in the world. As of 2026, sales of battle-tested Israeli weapons have more than doubled in five years, reaching almost $15 billion in 2024, including to nations that publicly avoid such deals with Israel.

== History ==
=== 1930-1970 ===
The manufacture of small weapons and explosives for the forerunners of the IDF had begun in secret arms factories during the 1930s. Jewish units fought the 1948 Arab–Israeli War of 1947-1949 with Sten guns, grenades, light mortars, antitank guns, flamethrowers, and light ammunition, much of it produced in Israel with surplus United States machinery acquired as scrap after World War II. After Israel's independence in 1948 and the departure of the British, the new state could import substantial wartime surplus aircraft, tanks, and artillery. The Israeli arms industry made a specialty of upgrading and overhauling such equipment. The Israeli-designed Uzi submachine gun, in service from 1954 and adopted by the security forces and the military of many nations, became a major export success, providing needed revenue for the Israeli arms industry. The Egyptian–Czechoslovak arms deal of 1955 and the 1956 Sinai War gave further impetus to domestic weapons production. Israel's decision to become a major producer of armaments came about after the arms embargo imposed by France, then Israel's main supplier of arms, just before the outbreak of the Six-Day War of June 1967.

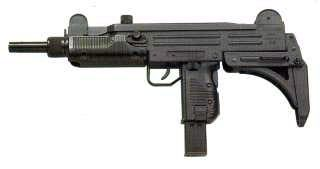
The Israeli-designed Uzi submachine gun, adopted in many nations, became a major Israeli export success.

=== 1970s ===
By the mid- to late 1970s, Israeli suppliers were delivering an increasing share of the IDF's major weapons systems. These systems included the Reshef missile boat, the Kfir fighter plane, the Gabriel missile, and the Merkava tank. The Kfir, based on plans of the French Mirage 5 acquired clandestinely through a Swiss source, was powered with a United States General Electric J79 engine, but embodied Israeli-designed and Israeli-produced components for the flight control and weapons delivery systems.

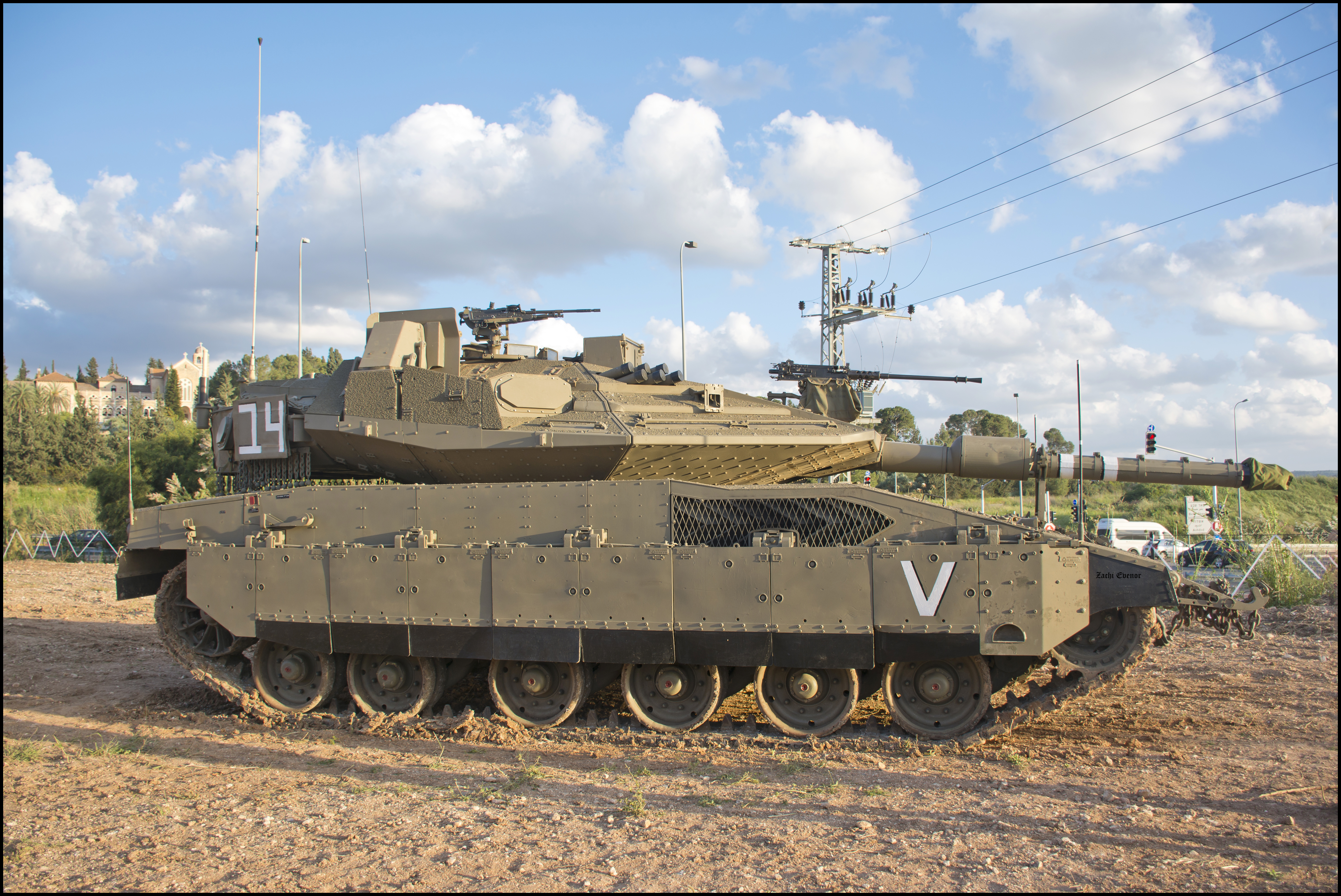
Merkava Mk 4M, the most recent upgrade of the Merkava tank, includes the Trophy active protection system.

Domestic production reduced foreign exchange costs for imports, provided a degree of self-sufficiency against the risk of arms embargoes, and facilitated the adaptation of foreign equipment designs to meet Israeli requirements. A high concentration of well-qualified scientists, engineers, and technicians, a growing industrial base, and a flow of government resources toward military research and development facilitated the rapid expansion of locally produced military equipment. Officials asserted that spinoffs from the arms industry, especially in electronics, had stimulated the civilian high technology sector, thus contributing indirectly to export earnings. This claim has been disputed by Israeli economists who concluded that the US$700 million spent annually on military research and development would have produced five times the value in export earnings had it been spent directly on civilian research and development. Even among government leaders, there was growing realization that the defense industry had become too large and that the government should not be obliged to come to the rescue of large defense firms in financial difficulty.

=== 1980s ===
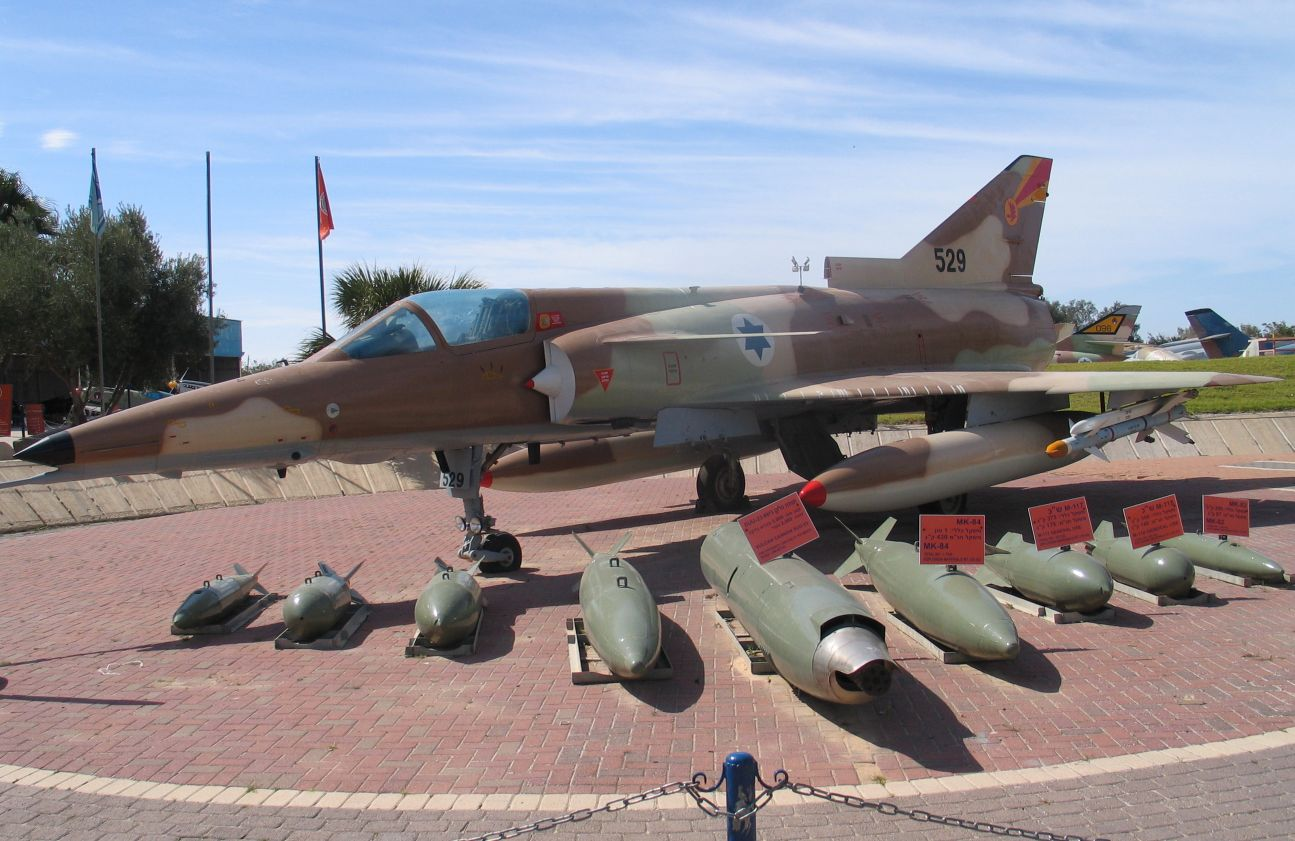
IAI Kfir jet fighter

In 1988, Israel's more than 150 defense and defense-related firms (thousands of other firms were engaged in subcontracting) fell into one of three ownership categories: state-owned enterprises, privately owned firms, and firms with mixed state and private ownership. One firm, Armament Development Authority, commonly known as Rafael, was the main military research and development agency responsible for translating the ordnance requirements of IDF field units into development projects. Rafael had a unique status under the direct supervision of the Ministry of Defense.

Total employment in the defense sector reached a peak of 65,000 persons in the mid-1980s, more than 20 percent of the industrial work force. By 1988, however, retrenchment of the defense budget and shrinkage of the world arms market had exposed the defense industry to severe financial losses and layoffs that reduced the work force to about 50,000 employees.

The largest of the defense firms was the government-owned conglomerate, Israel Aerospace Industries (IAI) that manufactured the Kfir and Arava aircraft, the RBY MK 1 light armored car, Gabriel antiship missiles, and high-speed patrol boats. IAI began in 1933 as a small machine shop, later catering to the maintenance and upgrading of the motley collection of aircraft acquired during the 1948 Arab–Israeli War. It continued to specialize in the overhaul and retrofitting of the whole range of aircraft in the air force inventory. Until the cancellation of the Lavi project in 1987, IAI had been entrusted with the development of the advanced fighter aircraft.

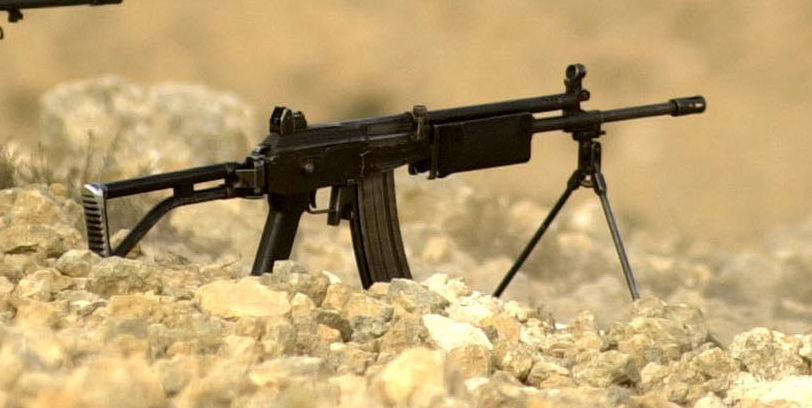
An IMI Galil rifle in service with the Israel Defense Forces in July 2000.

The factories of Israel Military Industries (IMI), another government-owned conglomerate, produced the Uzi submachine gun, the IMI Galil rifle, explosives, propellants, artillery shells, and light ammunition. IMI also specialized in the upgrading and conversion of tanks and other armored vehicles. Tadiran Electronic Industries was the largest private firm engaged in defense production, notably communications, electronic warfare, and command and control systems, as well as the pilotless reconnaissance aircraft (UAVs) of which Israel had become a leading manufacturer. Soltam, another private firm, specialized in mortars and artillery munitions.

Growth of the defense industry was achieved by a mixture of imported technology and Israeli innovation. Israeli firms purchased production rights and entered into joint ventures with foreign companies to manufacture both end products and components. Nearly every electronics firm had links of some sort with United States producers. Purchase agreements for foreign military equipment frequently specified that production data and design information, together with coproduction rights, be accorded to Israel. Nevertheless, American firms often were reluctant to supply advanced technology because of fears that Israel would adapt the technology for use in items to be exported to third countries on an unrestricted basis. Some American firms also feared that collaboration would encourage Israeli competition in already saturated world markets.

=== The Lavi Program ===
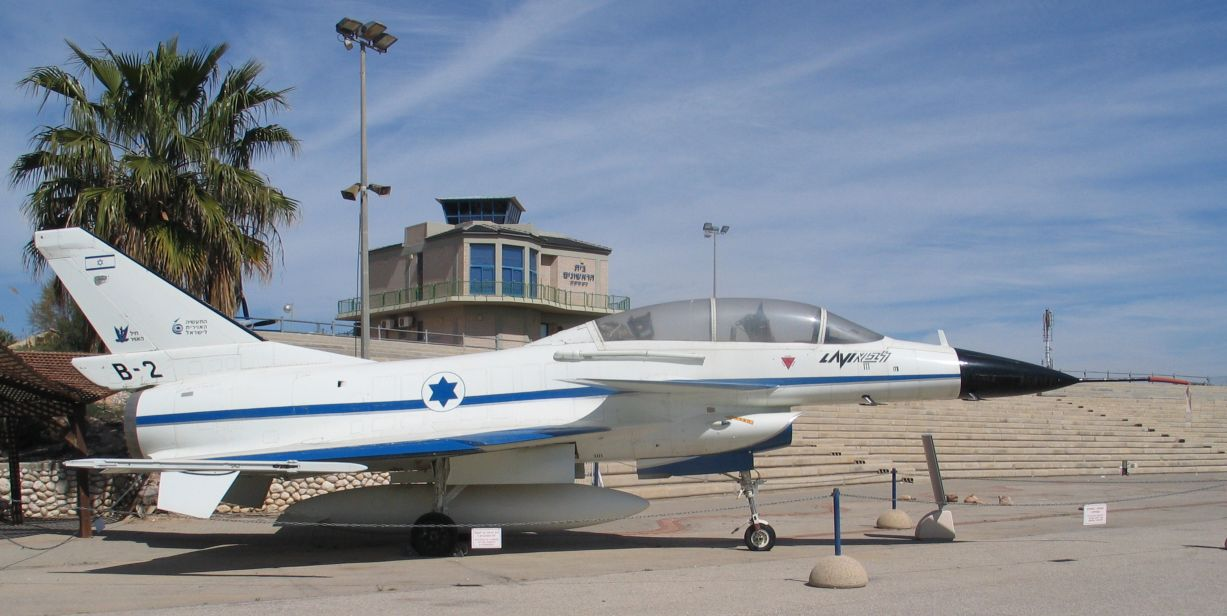
IAI Lavi

In 1980 the Government of Israel took the decision to use the experience IAI had accumulated to develop and manufacture a modern fighter plane to be the mainstay of the Israel Air Force. The aircraft, called the IAI Lavi ("lion cub"), was to be a superior attack aircraft with advanced weapons systems. It had its rollout in July 1986 and successful maiden flight in December 1986.

In August 1987, after extensive government deliberations, the decision was made (by one vote) to cancel the Lavi program, due to the questioning of Israel's economic ability to support the cost of such an extensive program. This led to a serious crisis at IAI which necessitated a major reorganization of the company's structure and business strategy; the company's work force of more than 22,000 people, was cut by 5,500 in 1988. However, the Lavi program was credited with developing a number of advanced technologies that IAI was able to market.

== Foreign military sales and assistance ==
By the late 1980s, Israel had become one of the world's leading suppliers of arms and security services, producing foreign exchange earnings estimated at US$1.5 billion annually, which represented one-third of the country's industrial exports. Because the defense industry was not subsidized by the government, it was indispensable for major arms manufacturers to develop export markets, which accounted in some cases for as much as 65 percent of total output. Foreign military sales at first consisted primarily of the transfer of surplus and rehabilitated equipment stocks and the administration of training and advisory missions. Particularly after the October 1973 War, however, foreign sales of surplus IDF stocks and weapons systems from newly developed production lines increased dramatically. Rehabilitated tanks and other Soviet equipment captured from Egypt and Syria were among the products marketed abroad. In addition to its economic and trade value, the expansion of the arms industry assured Israel of the availability of a higher production capacity to supply the IDF at wartime levels. It also provided Israel with opportunities to develop common interests with countries with which it did not maintain diplomatic relations and to cultivate politically useful contacts with foreign military leaders.

Initially, most of Israel's arms sales were to Third World countries, but, owing to financial difficulties faced by these clients and to competition from new Third World arms producers such as Brazil and Taiwan, different sales strategies had to be adopted. In part through joint ventures and coproduction, Israel succeeded in breaking into the more lucrative American and West European markets. By the early 1980s, more than fifty countries on five continents had become customers for Israeli military equipment. Among Israel's clients were communist states (China and Romania), Muslim states (Morocco, Turkey, Indonesia, and Malaysia), and so-called pariah states (South Africa and Iran). To some degree, Israel was restricted in its marketing by United States controls over arms transactions involving the transfer of components or technology of United States origin. In one well-publicized case, the United States vetoed the sale of twelve Kfir fighters to Uruguay in 1978. Intimidation of potential buyers by Arab states also presented a problem. Observers believed that Arab pressure played a part in decisions by Austria and Taiwan not to purchase the Kfir and in Brazil's decision not to choose the Gabriel missile for its navy.

The broader issues of Israel's foreign military sales program were decided by a cabinet committee on weapons transfers. Routine applications to sell arms to countries approved by this committee were reviewed by the Defense Sales Office of the Ministry of Defense. The primary concerns were that arms supplied by Israel not fall into the hands of its enemies and that secret design innovations not be compromised. After 1982, however, security restrictions were relaxed to permit export of high technology weapons and electronics.

In the 1980s, South Africa was believed to be one of Israel's principal trade partners. South Africa was known to have acquired 6 Reshef missile boats, more than 100 Gabriel missiles, and radar and communications systems, and to have obtained Israel's assistance in upgrading its British-built Centurion tanks. The South African-manufactured Atlas Cheetah fighter airplane unveiled in 1986 was a copy of the Kfir C-2 produced in collaboration with IAI. Subsequent to the passage of the Comprehensive Anti-Apartheid Act of 1986 in the United States, which mandated a cut-off of military aid to countries selling arms to South Africa, Israel announced that it would not enter into any new arms contracts with Pretoria. Existing contracts, however, which would not be canceled, were reported to be valued at between US$400 and US$800 million.

Military cooperation between Israel and Iran had been extensive since the 1960s, under the shah's regime. After a brief rupture of relations when Ayatollah Sayyid Ruhollah Musavi Khomeini came to power in 1979, cooperation resumed. The Israeli minister of defense in 1982 acknowledged the negotiation of an arrangement worth US$28 million, including spare parts for United States-manufactured airplanes and tanks in the early 1980s. The Israeli motivating factor was the belief that it was to Israel's strategic advantage to help Iran in its war against Iraq, an Arab state bitterly hostile to Israel. Although Israel announced an embargo of arms transactions after disclosure of its involvement in the plan to trade arms for the release of United States hostages in Lebanon, a stricter directive had to be issued in November 1987, following reports that weapons of Israeli origin continued to reach the Iranians.

Prior to the mass severance of diplomatic relations with Israel after the October 1973 War, Israel had actively promoted military collaboration with a number of African countries. Training or advisory missions had been established in at least ten African states. During the 1980s, Israel quietly resumed these activities in several places, most notably Zaire. Israel dispatched teams there to train elite units and to help reorganize and rearm a division deployed in Shaba Province. Israel also equipped and trained Cameroon's presidential guard unit. Limited pilot training programs were extended to Liberia and to Ciskei.

The US and Israel generally are considered allies and thus have many strong ties through defense industry, but there have been notable controversies over the years and at present. These have included the 'Dotan Scandal' of diverted funds and violations of the US ITAR restrictions by selling sensitive equipment and data to China (in particular the Phalcon incident in the 1990s). China has continued to make clear its intentions to keep Israel close both in defense and business. This makes the Israel–United States relations tense and uncertain, despite economic benefits to both. In 2020, the US pressured Israel to bar all Chinese components from inclusion in any communications systems, security cameras and control boxes, Wi–Fi systems, and other peripheral items used in computer networks.

Israel's arms sales to Bosnia, and Rwanda have been sealed. Israel has been alleged to have sold arms to Chile, Myanmar, and South Sudan.

In March 2026, a report by Stockholm International Peace Research Institute (SIPRI), ranked Israel the seventh-largest exporter of major arms worldwide for 2021–2025, accounting for 4.4% of global arms exports.

As of 2026, sales of battle-tested Israeli weapons have more than doubled over the last five years, reaching a record of nearly $15 billion in 2024, including to countries that publicly avoid weapons deals with Israel.

In the first half of 2026, Israel's defense industry jumped to $3.26 billion, with increased interested from international customers.

== Aerospace ==
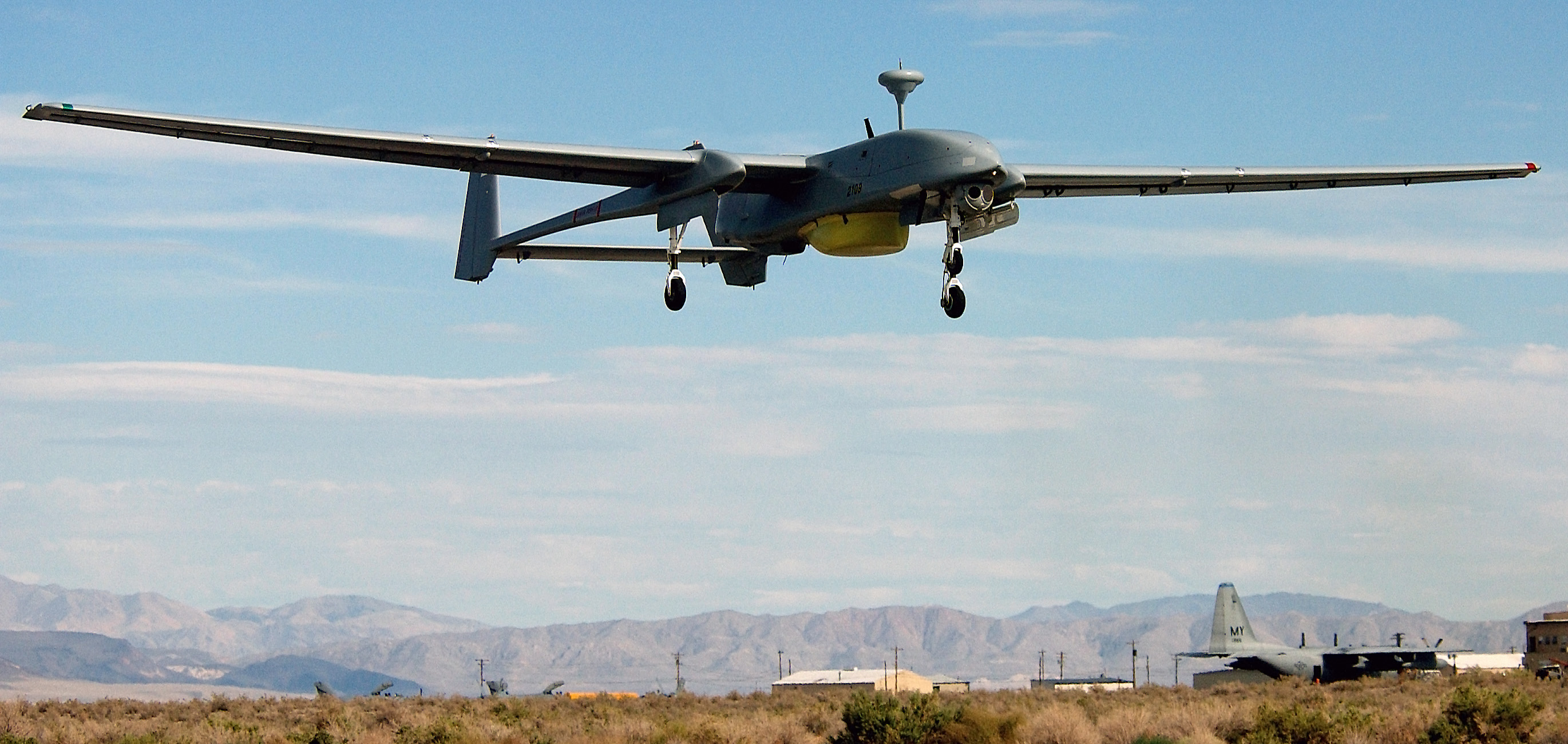
IAI Heron, an unmanned aerial vehicle developed by the Malat (UAV) division of Israel Aerospace Industries.

Israel Aerospace Industries or IAI (תע"א) is Israel's prime aerospace and aviation manufacturer, producing aerial systems for both military and civilian usage. It has 16,000 employees as of 2007. IAI is wholly owned by the government of Israel.

Israel is considered to be the leading UAV exporter in the world. According to the Stockholm International Peace Research Institute, Israeli defense companies were behind 41% of all drones exported in 2001-2011.

== Major manufacturers ==
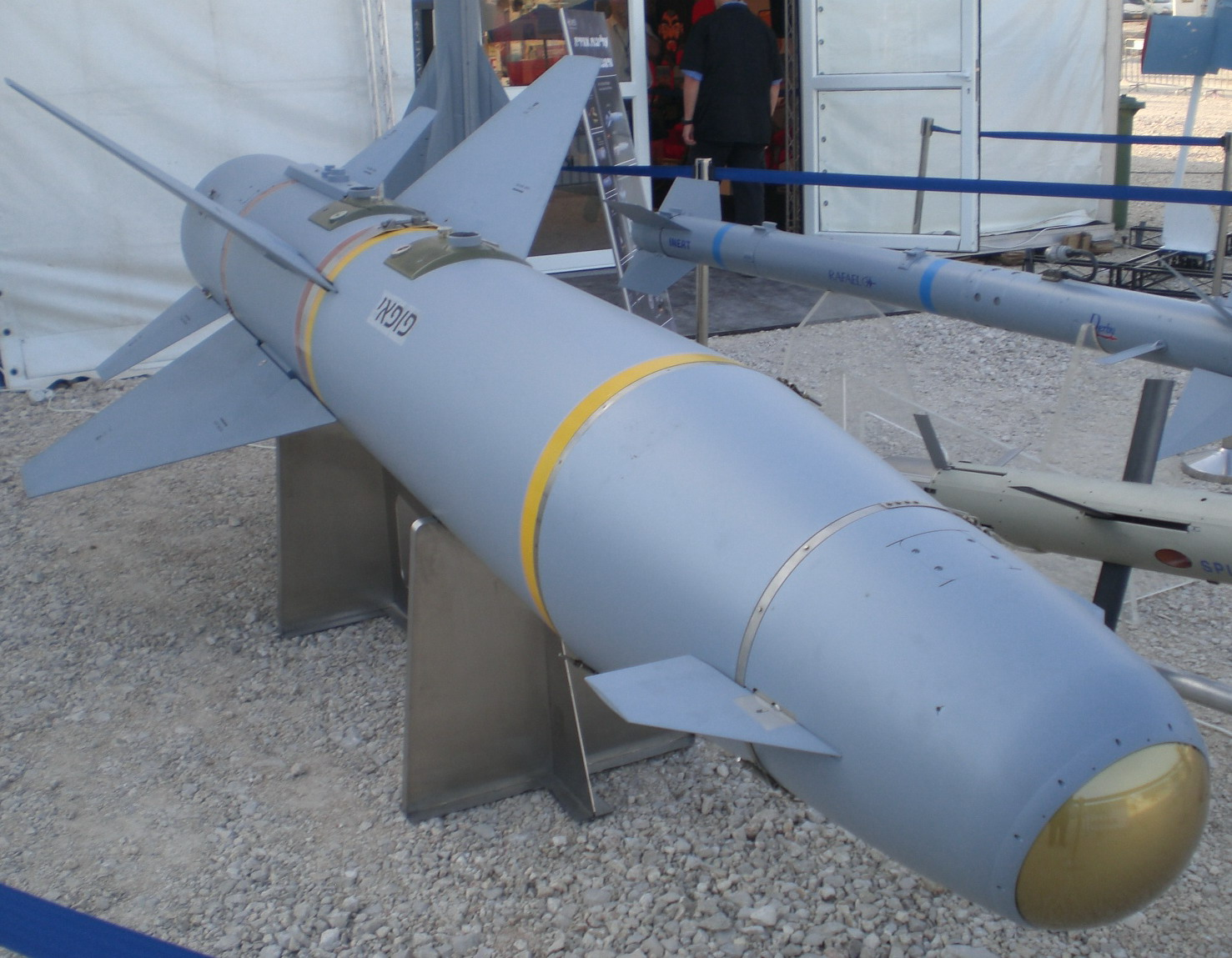
Rafael Popeye standoff missile

Israel Military Industries Ltd. (IMI), also referred to as Taas (Hebrew: תעש, התעשייה הצבאית), is an Israeli weapons manufacturer. It manufactures firearms, ammunition and military technology mainly for Israeli security forces (especially Israel's army, the Israel Defense Forces or IDF), although its small arms are very popular throughout the world.

In 2005, the "Magen" Small Arms Division of IMI was privatized, and named Israel Weapon Industries (IWI). IWI is part of a group of companies that develops and manufactures a wide array of guns and rifles used by armies and law enforcement agencies around the world.

Rafael Advanced Defense Systems, known as RAFAEL or Rafael, is another large Israeli defense technology company. It was founded as Israel’s National R&D Defense Laboratory for the development of weapons and military technology within the Ministry of Defense; in 2002 it was incorporated as a limited company. Rafael develops and produces weapons, military, and defense technologies for the Israel Defense Forces and for export abroad. All current projects are classified.

== See also ==
- List of countries supplying arms to Israel
- List of equipment of the Israel Defense Forces

== Works cited ==
- Metz, Helen Chapin, ed. (1990). Israel: a country study. Washington, D.C.: Federal Research Division, Library of Congress. OCLC 44197966. This article incorporates text from this source, which is in the public domain.
