= CPPC =

CPPC may refer to:

== Organisations ==
- Colección Patricia Phelps de Cisneros, a Latin American art organization based in Venezuela and New York City, US
- Caribbean Plant Protection Commission; See Regional Plant Protection Organization
- Chip PC Technologies (TASE: CPPC), a developer and manufacturer of thin client solutions and management software
- Portuguese Council for Peace and Cooperation, a member of the Secretariat of the World Peace Council

== Other uses ==
- Collaborative processor performance control, a system of CPU frequency adjustment

== See also ==
- Chinese People's Political Consultative Conference (CPPCC), a political advisory body in China
