= E-LynX =

Communication system

E-LynX is a product family of digital military radio equipment (software defined radios, SDR) from Telefunken Radio Communication Systems GmbH & Co. KG, the German subsidiary of the Israeli Elbit Group. The system is used by several forces like the Nederlandse krijgsmacht, the Swiss Army, the Indian Forces and other. Up from 2019, the Army of German Bundeswehr equipped its forces with E-LynX PNR 1000 in a portable and vehicle version.

The radio enables voice and data communication for a variety of application scenarios and units. The devices enable data, voice and video transmission at the same time. The system enables real-time positioning of one's own forces based on the integrated “Blue Force Tracking” capability. A multi-hop process is intended to significantly increase the range and to improve network agility and robustness and also reducing of latency.

== Users ==
Germany: The E-LynX devices are used by the Bundeswehr at troop, group, platoon and company level, as well as on board various combat vehicles such as the SPz PUMA. But the main SDR system will be SOVERON by R&S.

Israel: IDF communication equipment is based since decades on Elbit Technology and also introducing the E-Lynx System.is operating

Switzerland: Switzerland has selected Elbit E-Lynx to replace vehicular tactical radio equipment of the Swiss military up from 2020.
