= Silver Marlin =

Israeli unmanned surface vehicle

Class overview
- Builders: Elbit Systems
- Operators: Israeli Navy; US Navy
- In service: 2006–present

General characteristics
- Type: Rigid hull inflatable boat
- Tonnage: 4,000 kg (8,800 lb)
- Length: 10.67 m (35.0 ft)
- Speed: 45 kn
- Range: 500 NM
- Capacity: 2,500 kg (5,500 lb) payload
- Sensors & processing systems: electro-optical, obstacle avoidance sensors
- Armament: 7.62mm remote-controlled stabilized weapon station

Silver Marlin is an Israeli unmanned surface vehicle (USV) designed for maritime patrol missions. It is equipped with a 7.62mm remote-controlled stabilized weapon station as well as observation and satellite communication systems. It has an endurance of 24–36 hours, with a primary mission of reconnaissance, surveillance, force protection/anti-terror, anti-surface and anti-mine warfare, search and rescue, port and waterway patrol, battle damage assessment, pollution detection and treatment as well as electronic warfare.

The Silver Marlin is 10.67 m (35.0 ft) long and 4,000 kg (8,800 lb) weight, and it has 2,500 kg (5,500 lb) payload capacity, and is powered by two 315 hp diesel engines.
