= Iron Sting =

Israeli 120 mm guided mortar round

Iron Sting Mortar
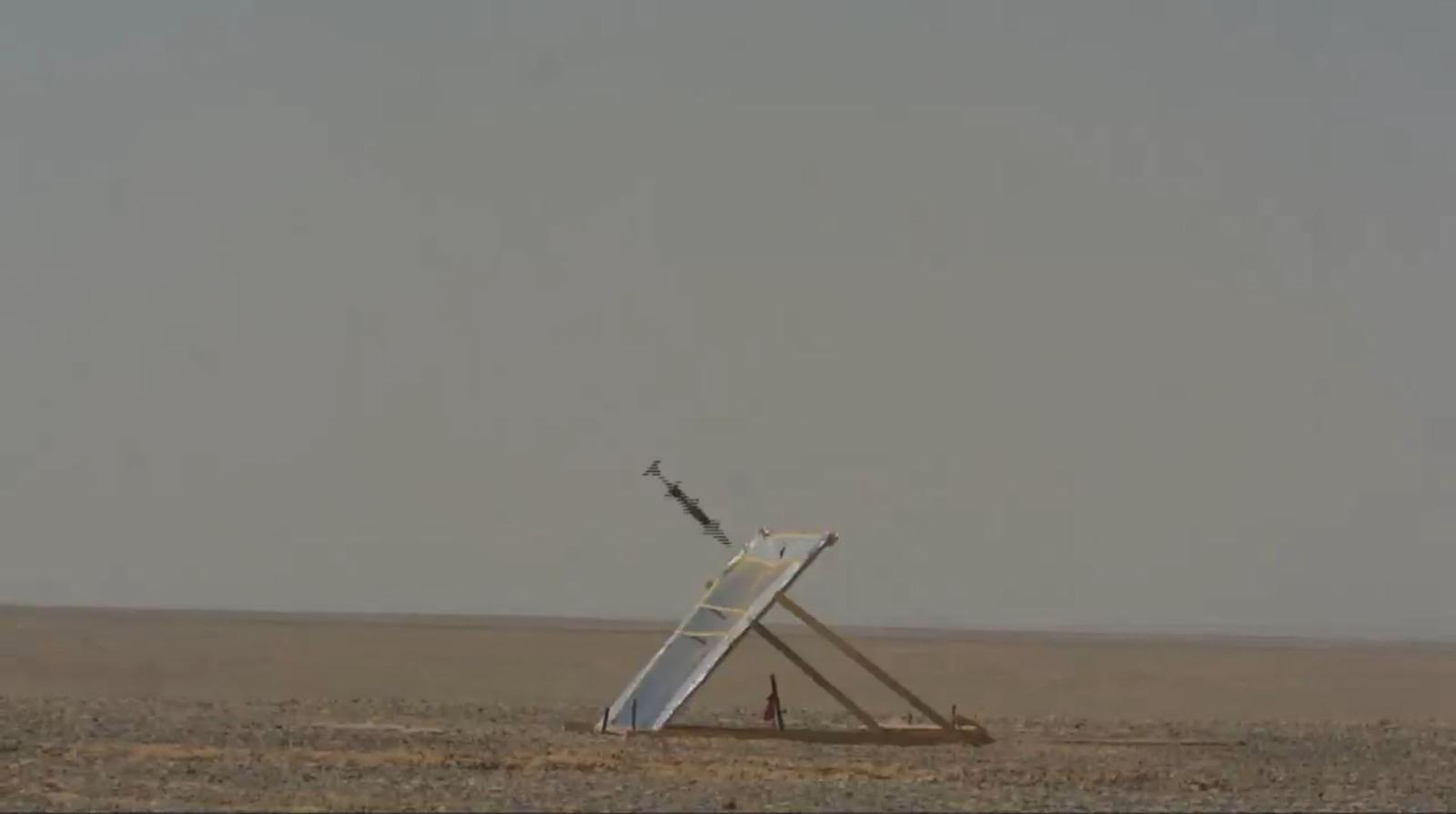
- Iron Sting mortar a split second before hitting its target
- Type: Guided Mortar
- Place of origin: Israel

Service history
- In service: 2022–present
- Used by: Israel Defense Forces
- Wars: Gaza war

Production history
- Designer: Elbit Systems
- Manufacturer: Elbit Systems

Specifications
- Caliber: 120 mm (4.7 in)
- Feed system: Manual
- Sights: Laser-guided and GPS-guided

The Iron Sting (Hebrew: עוקץ פלדה, Oketz Plada) is a 120 mm guided mortar munition developed by Elbit Systems of Israel, currently in use by the Israel Defense Forces (IDF). The Iron Sting is designed for use with the "Keshet" and "Hanit" mortars in service with the IDF's Infantry Corps. It features dual guidance: laser and GPS, allowing for precise strikes, including in urban areas, minimizing the risk of collateral damage.

== Background ==
Development of the Iron Sting began in the early 2010s and continued after Elbit Systems acquired the military industry. In March 2021, the Iron Sting completed a successful series of tests, marking the end of its development phase and indicating its readiness for delivery to the IDF. The IDF procured the Iron Sting during 2021–2022, and it is operated by reconnaissance platoons.

The Iron Sting saw its first operational use during the Gaza war.

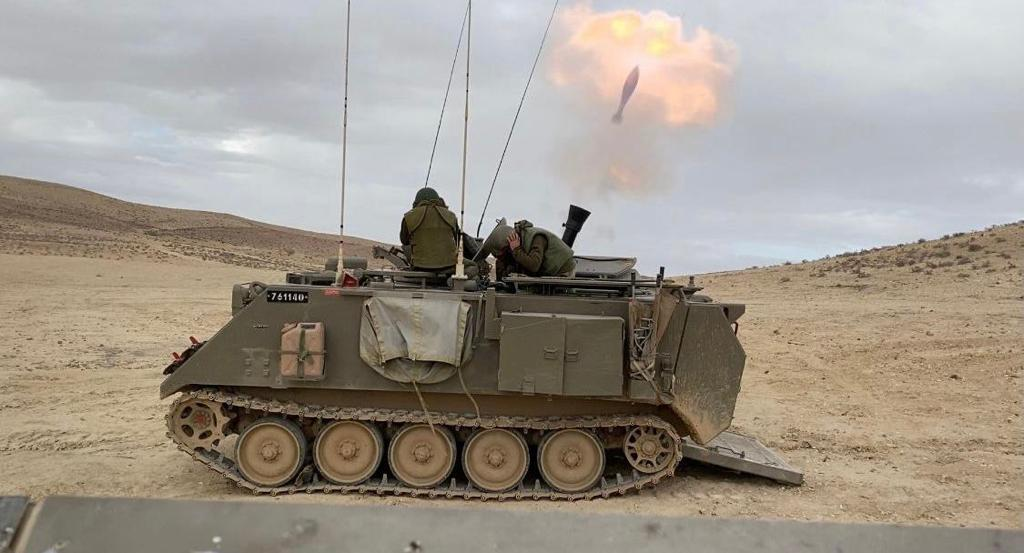

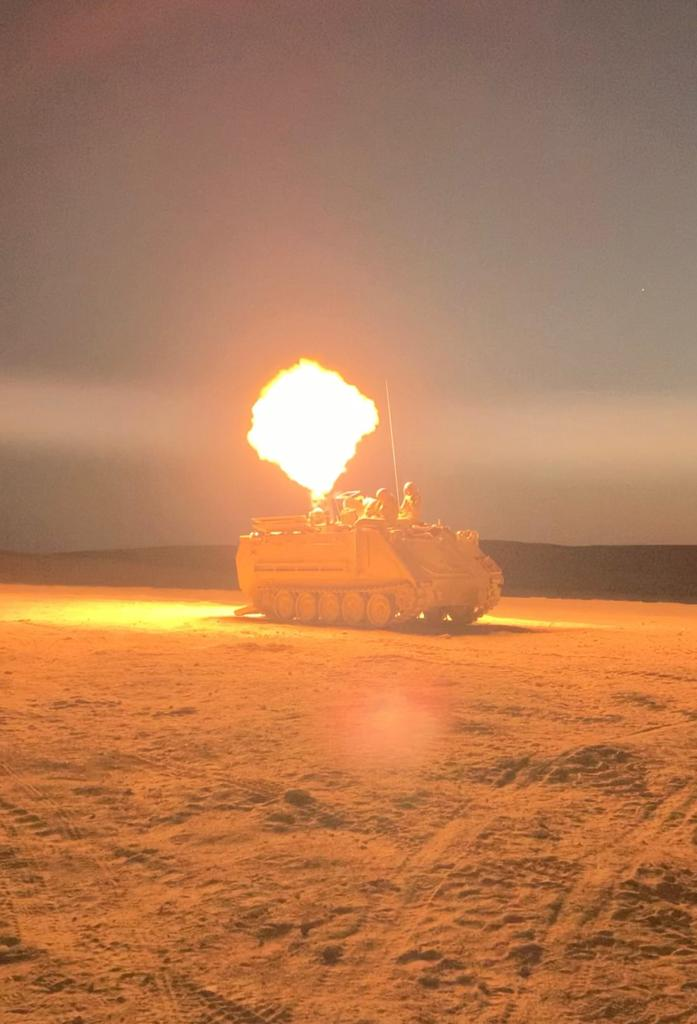

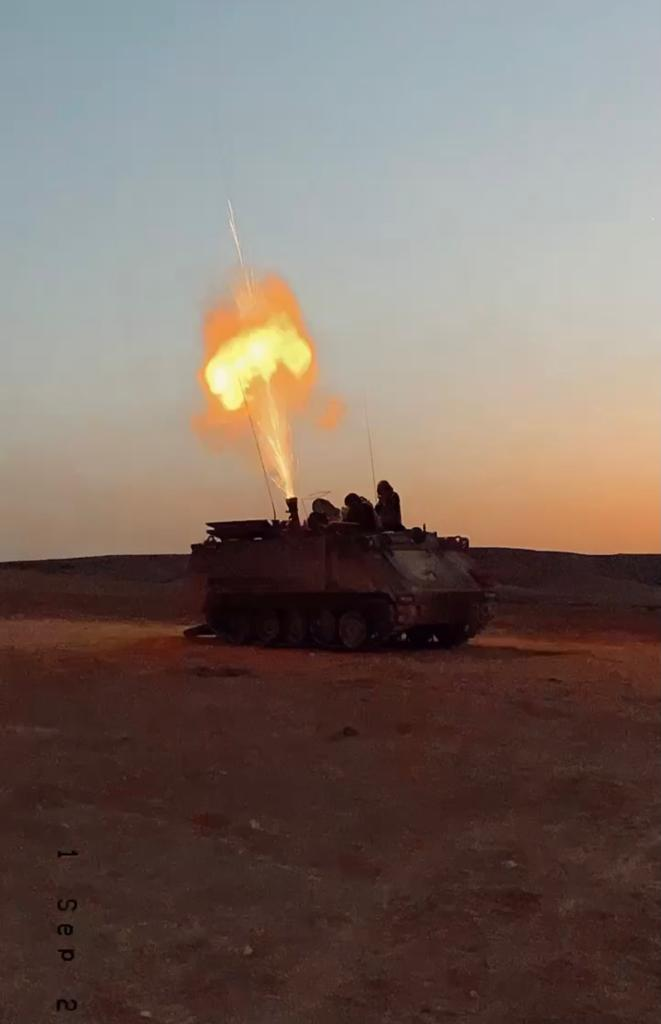

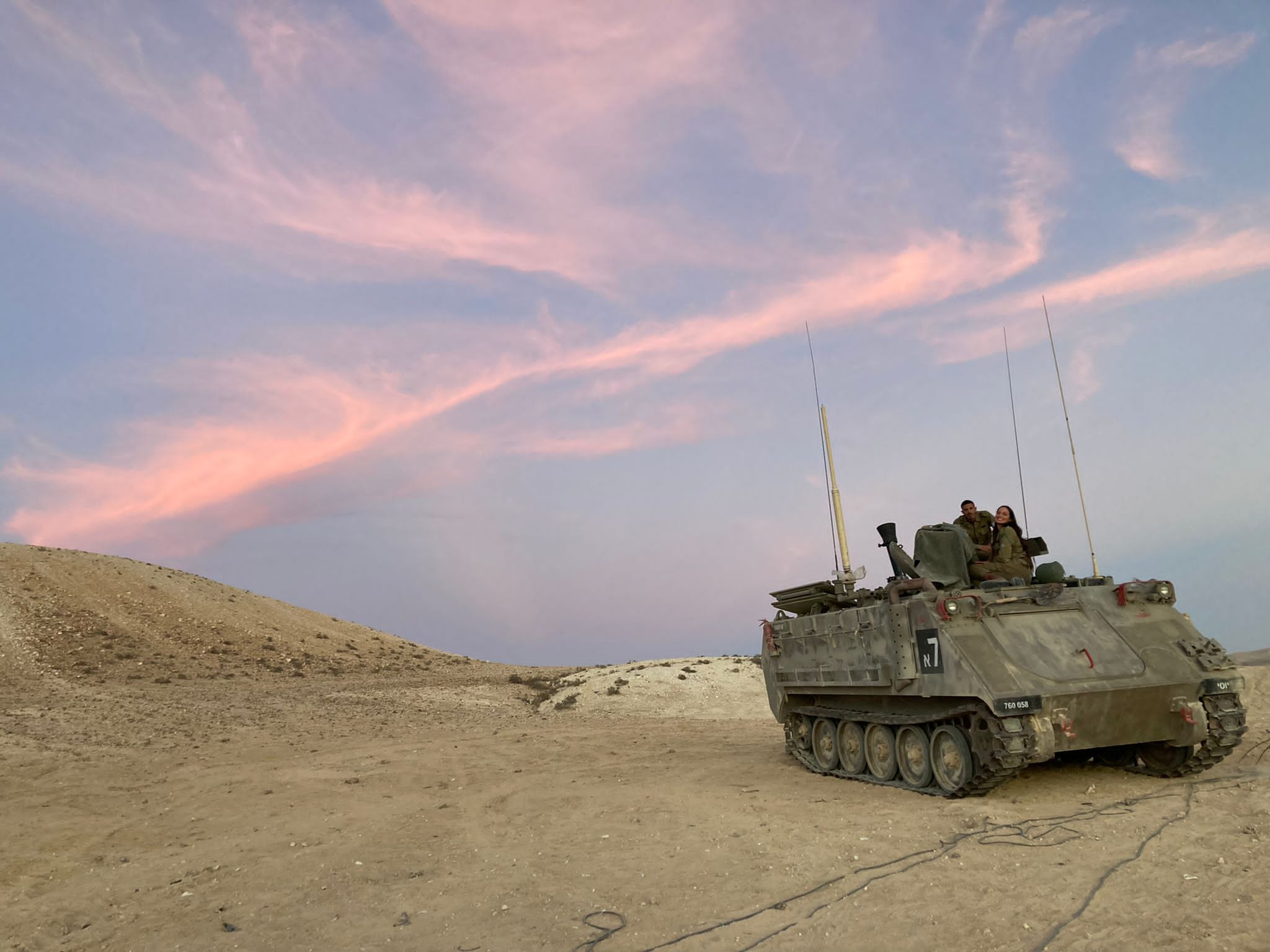
