= Silver Arrow Sniper =

Reconnaissance UAV developed in Israel

Sniper

General information
- Type: Reconnaissance UAV
- National origin: Israel
- Manufacturer: Elbit Systems

The Silver Arrow Sniper is a reconnaissance UAV developed in Israel in the 1990s.

The Sniper's configuration resembles that of a conventional private aircraft with fixed tricycle landing gear, driven by a nose-mounted propeller and a 28.5 kW (38 horsepower) piston engine. Its only unusual feature is an upright vee tail.

== Specifications ==
General characteristics

- Crew: None
- Capacity: 25 kg (55 lb) payload
- Length: 3.80 m (12 ft 6 in)
- Wingspan: 5.2 m (17 ft 0 in)
- Empty weight: 155 kg (342 lb)
- Powerplant: 1 × UEL AR 741 , 28 kW (38 hp)

Performance

- Maximum speed: 175 km/h (110 mph, 96 kn)
- Endurance: >6 hours
- Service ceiling: 4,600 m (15,000 ft)
