= Silver Arrow Micro-V =

Micro-V, Mini-V

General information
- Type: Reconnaissance UAV
- National origin: Israel
- Manufacturer: Elbit Systems

History
- First flight: 1989

The Silver Arrow Mini-V (originally named the Micro-V) is a small reconnaissance UAV developed in Israel in the 1990s.

It is powered by twin 3 kW (4 horsepower) piston engines, one in a nacelle on each wing driving a pusher propeller. It has no landing gear. The Micro-V appears to be too small to carry a full sensor turret, carrying a miniaturized imager in a transparent section built into the middle of its fuselage.

== Specifications ==
Data from Unmanned Aerial Directory: Part 1

General characteristics

- Crew: None
- Capacity: 8 kg (18 lb) payload
- Length: 2.87 m (9 ft 5 in)
- Wingspan: 3.60 m (11 ft 9.75 in)
- Height: 0.57 m (1 ft 10.5 in)
- Empty weight: 27 kg (60 lb)
- Gross weight: 45.5 kg (100 lb)
- Powerplant: 2 × piston engines , 3.0 kW (4.0 hp) each

Performance

- Maximum speed: 204 km/h (127 mph, 110 kn)
- Cruise speed: 93 km/h (58 mph, 50 kn)
- Endurance: 5 hours
- Service ceiling: 4,600 m (15,000 ft)
- Rate of climb: 5.6 m/s (1,100 ft/min)
