= Elbit Systems =

Israeli military technology company

Elbit Systems Ltd.

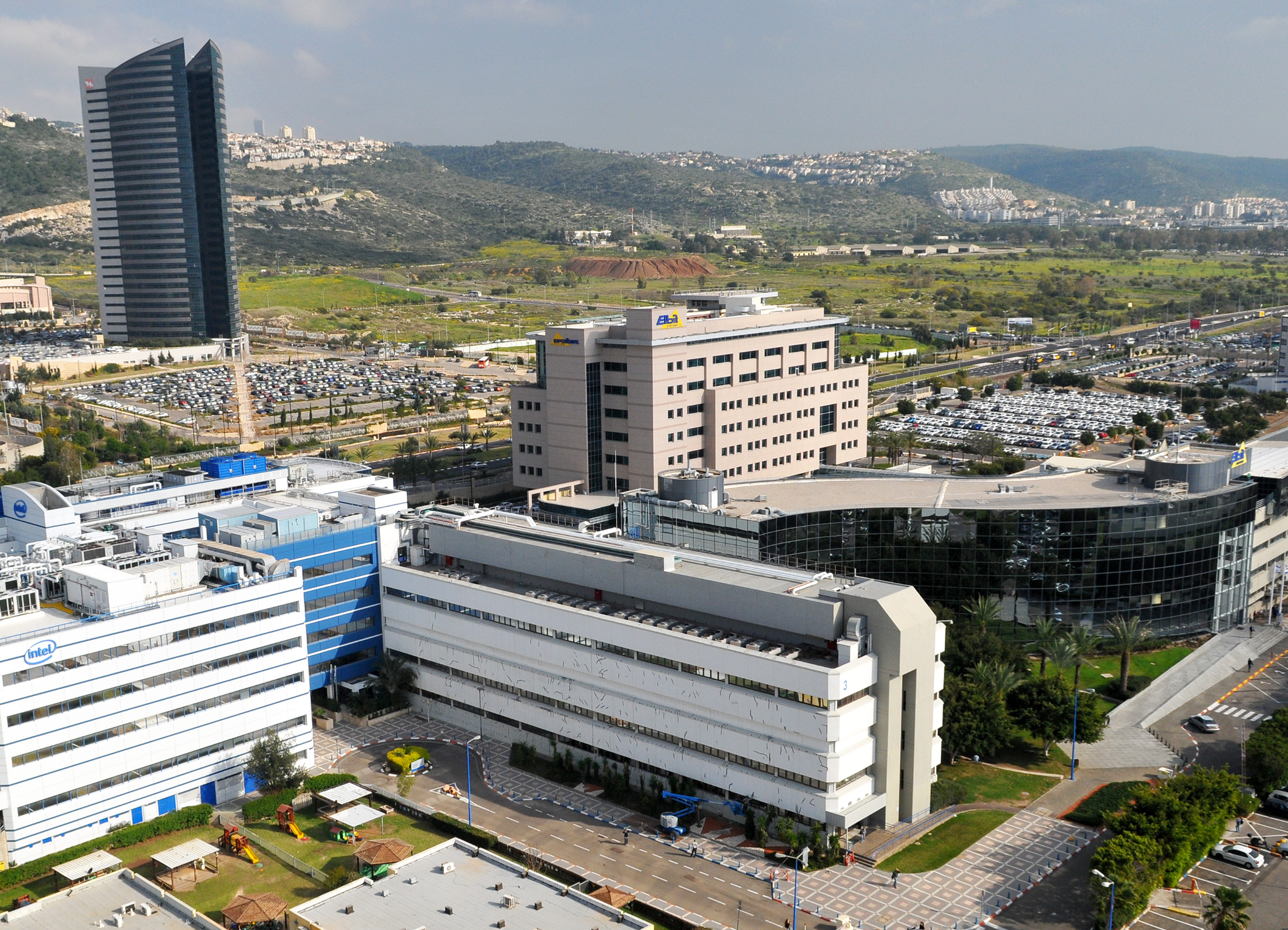
- Elbit headquarters at Matam High-tech park in Haifa
- Type: Public
- Traded as: TASE: ESLT; Nasdaq: ESLT
- ISIN: IL0010811243
- Industry: Military technology; Defense contracting
- Founded: 1966; 60 years ago
- Headquarters: Haifa, Israel
- Key people: Michael Federmann (chairman); Bezhalel Machlis (CEO and president)
- Revenue: ▲US$7.94 billion (2025)
- Operating income: ▲US$671 million (2025)
- Net income: ▲US$534 million (2025)
- Total assets: ▲US$12.7 billion (2025)
- Total equity: ▲US$4.13 billion (2025)
- Number of employees: 20,537 (2025)
- Subsidiaries: Elbit Systems of America; Elbit Systems Electro-Optics – Elop; Elbit Systems Land and C^{4}I; Elbit Systems EW and SIGINT – Elisra
- Website: elbitsystems.com

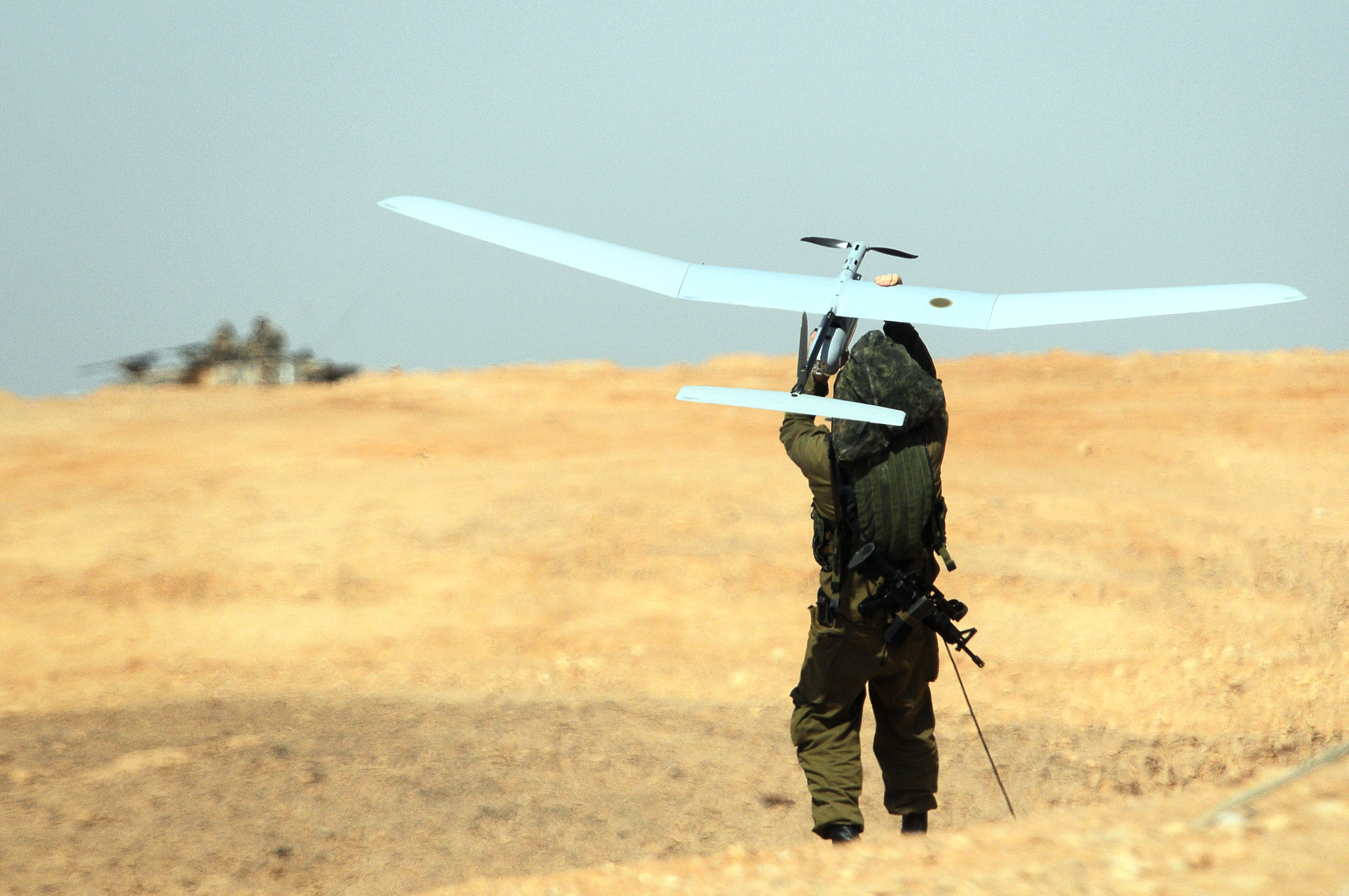
Elbit Skylark 1 unmanned aerial vehicle

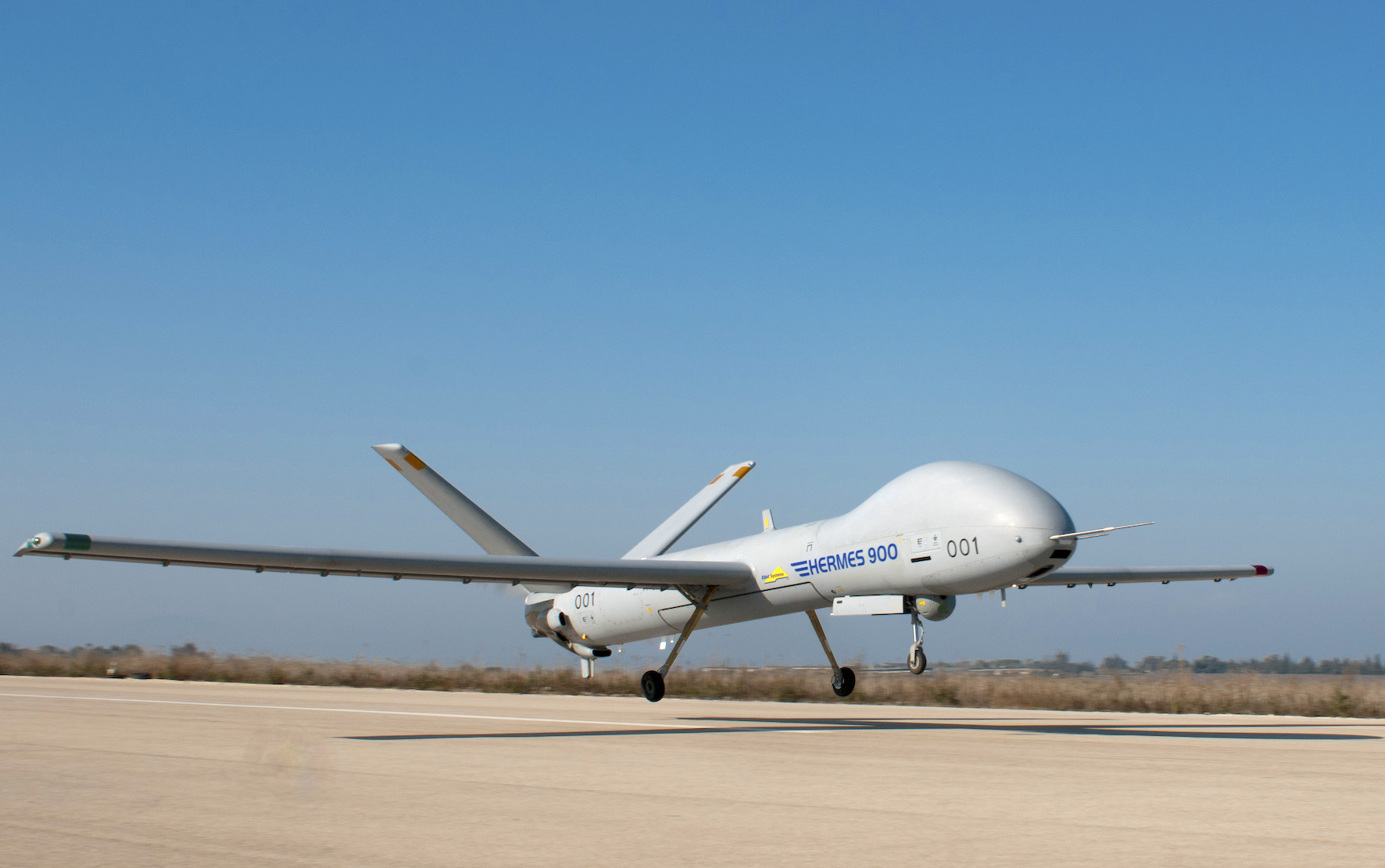
Elbit Hermes 900 unmanned aerial vehicle

Elbit Systems Ltd. is an Israel-based international military technology company and defense contractor. Founded in 1966 by Elron, Elbit Systems is the primary provider of the Israeli military's land-based equipment and unmanned aerial vehicles. It is an important company within the defense industry of Israel.

Elbit Systems also has subsidiary factories around the world, and sells its products to various countries' militaries. At its subsidiary factories, especially in the United Kingdom, the United States and Germany, the company has faced protests for its support of the Israeli military in the ongoing Israeli–Palestinian conflict. The company has also been divested from by international investment firms due to its involvement in the conflict.

In a 2025 investor relations presentation, Elbit Systems reported having 20,000 employees, with 3,200 of them based in the United States. Elbit Systems' shares are traded on the Tel Aviv and Nasdaq stock exchanges.

== History ==
Elbit Systems was founded in 1966 by Elron Electronic Industries and the Israel's Ministry of Defense, under the name 'Elbit Computers Ltd.', to develop computers and electronics for the Israeli military, its first product was a minicomputer named 'Elbit 100'. The minicomputer was successfully sold for civilian use, and in July 1970 the American company Control Data Corporation entered into an agreement to acquire the Israeli government's interest in Elbit Computers for US$1 million. Control Data Corporation marketed and distributed Elbit Computers' around the world.

In 1978 Elbit had an initial public offering on the Tel Aviv Stock Exchange and continued to develop minicomputers, including a model called ANAT, that was developed and sold in corporation with German company Nixdorf Computer. During the early 1980s the company refocused on defense electronics and developed systems and sub-components for the Lavi fighter jet and for the Merkava tank. The company also changed its name from 'Elbit Computers Ltd.' to 'Elbit Ltd.' and Control Data Corporation sold its stake in the company.

In 1996, Elbit was spun off into three independent companies: Elbit Medical Imaging, Elbit Systems, and Elbit. From 1999 to 2000, Elscint (another affiliate of Elron) and Elbit Medical Imaging sold their imaging activities to General Electric Medical Systems and Picker. Elbit Systems was created as the defense electronics arm of the company. Elbit, which focused on communications activities, led the consortium that founded Partner Communications Company in 1999.

In 2000, Elbit Systems merged with El-Op (then controlled by current Elbit chairman, Michael Federmann), creating the largest non-governmental defense electronics company in Israel. Elron sold its shares in Elbit Systems for approximately $197 million in 2004. Following the merger with El-Op, Federmann became the largest shareholder of the combined group. Following its merger, Elbit acquired Elisra, assets of Israel Military Industries' Aircraft Systems Division, and Mikal Ltd. (Note: The company initially purchased 19% of the firm, and later agreed to acquire Mikal's 100% holdings in Soltam Systems, Saymar, and the 87.85% portion of ITL held by Mikal; in exchange, Mikal's owners received the 19% of Mikal that Elbit had purchased.) Elbit subsequently announced a cash tender offer for the 12.15% remainder of ITL Optronics Ltd held by the public.

In 2002, Elbit was merged into Elron.

In 2006, Elbit acquired 20% of Chip PC Technologies, a developer and manufacturer of client solutions for server-based computing. In 2016, Elbit launched Everysight, a developer and manufacturer of an augmented reality smartglasses for cyclists, founded in 2016.

In 2016, The Intercept reported that, starting in 2008, the US National Security Agency and UK GCHQ had been tapping into live feeds from Elbit drones (among other Israeli air force equipment) as they were flown on missions by the Israeli military and air force against targets in Gaza, the West Bank, Syria, and Lebanon.

In November 2018, Elbit completed its acquisition of IMI Systems.

== Products ==
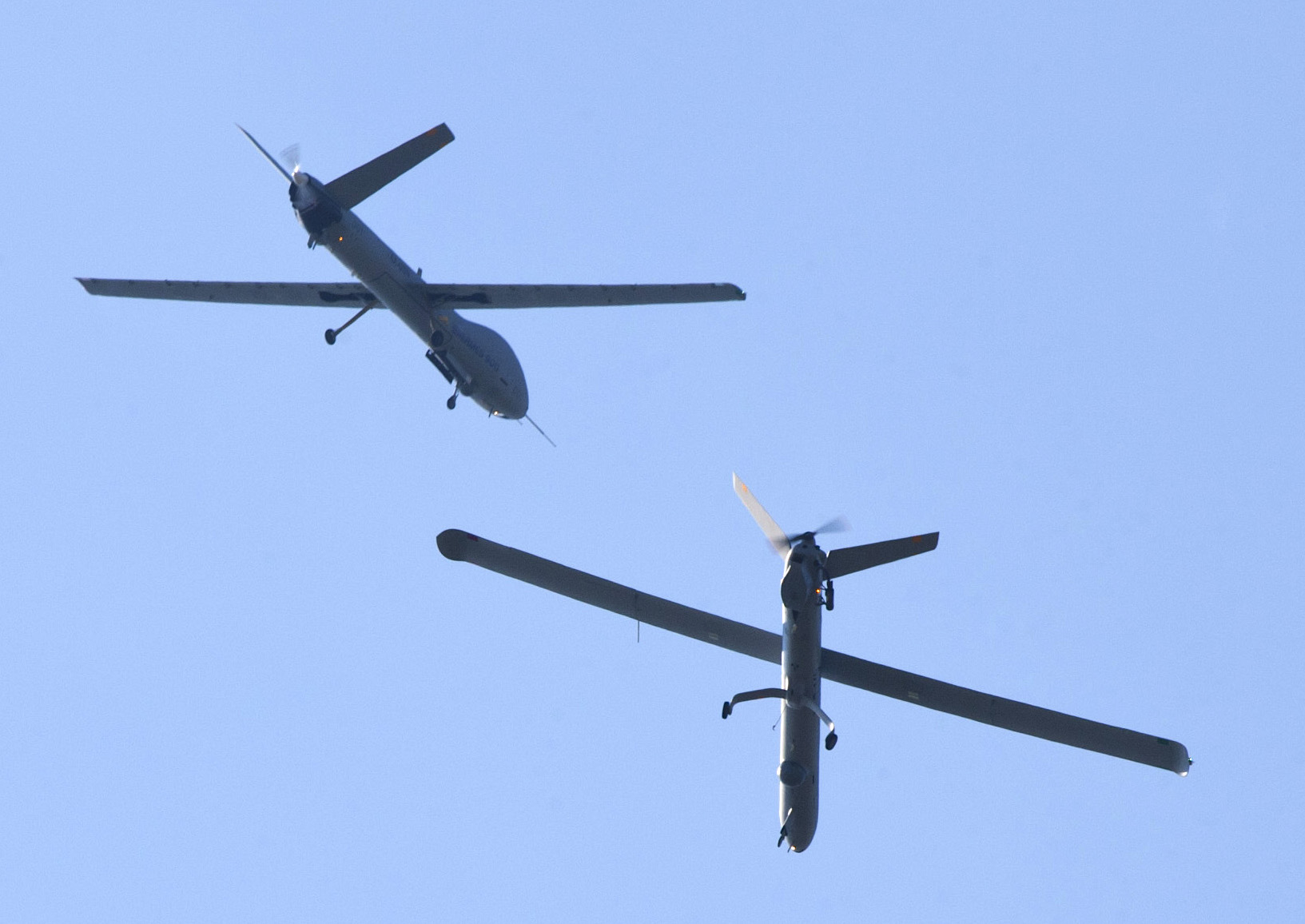
Elbit Hermes 900 and Elbit Hermes 450 unmanned aerial vehicles in formation

Elbit Systems and its various subsidiaries provide various technologies for military command, control, communications, intelligence surveillance, and reconnaissance purposes. The company produces unmanned aircraft systems (UAS), electro-optics hardware, electronic warfare, signal intelligence (SIGINT) systems, and radio and communications products.

- Unmanned aerial vehicles
  - Elbit Hermes 90
  - Elbit Hermes 450
  - Elbit Hermes 650 Spark
  - Elbit Hermes 900
  - Elbit Lanius
  - Elbit Legion-X
  - Elbit Skylark
  - Silver Arrow Micro-V
  - Silver Arrow Sniper
  - SkyStriker
- Unmanned surface vehicles
  - Silver Marlin
- Communication
  - E-LynX
- Guided mortars
  - Iron Sting
- Self-propelled howitzers
  - SIGMA 155

== Global operations ==
Elbit does business globally. According to its 2026 investor presentation, its global revenues break down by region as follows:(% of global revenues in brackets):

- Israel (32%)
- North America (21%): operations in United States and Canada
- Europe (27%): operations in United Kingdom, Germany, Romania, Netherlands, Switzerland, Austria, Hungary, Sweden, Finland, with a wholly-owned subsidiary in Belgium
- Asia-Pacific (16%): operations in Australia, UAE, India
- Latin America and other (4%): operations in Brazil

=== Israel ===
Elbit Systems is the largest Israeli military manufacturer and produces 85% of the Israel Defense Force's land-based equipment as well as 85% of the drones used by the Israeli Air Force. Elbit advertises that its equipment has been battle-tested by the IDF in operations in Gaza and the West Bank. Elbit's drones have been involved in multiple incidents involving civilian deaths. While Israel does not officially acknowledge that its drones are used to carry out strikes in Gaza or elsewhere, a 2016 report published by The Intercept suggested that Israel has used attack drones in fatal attacks.

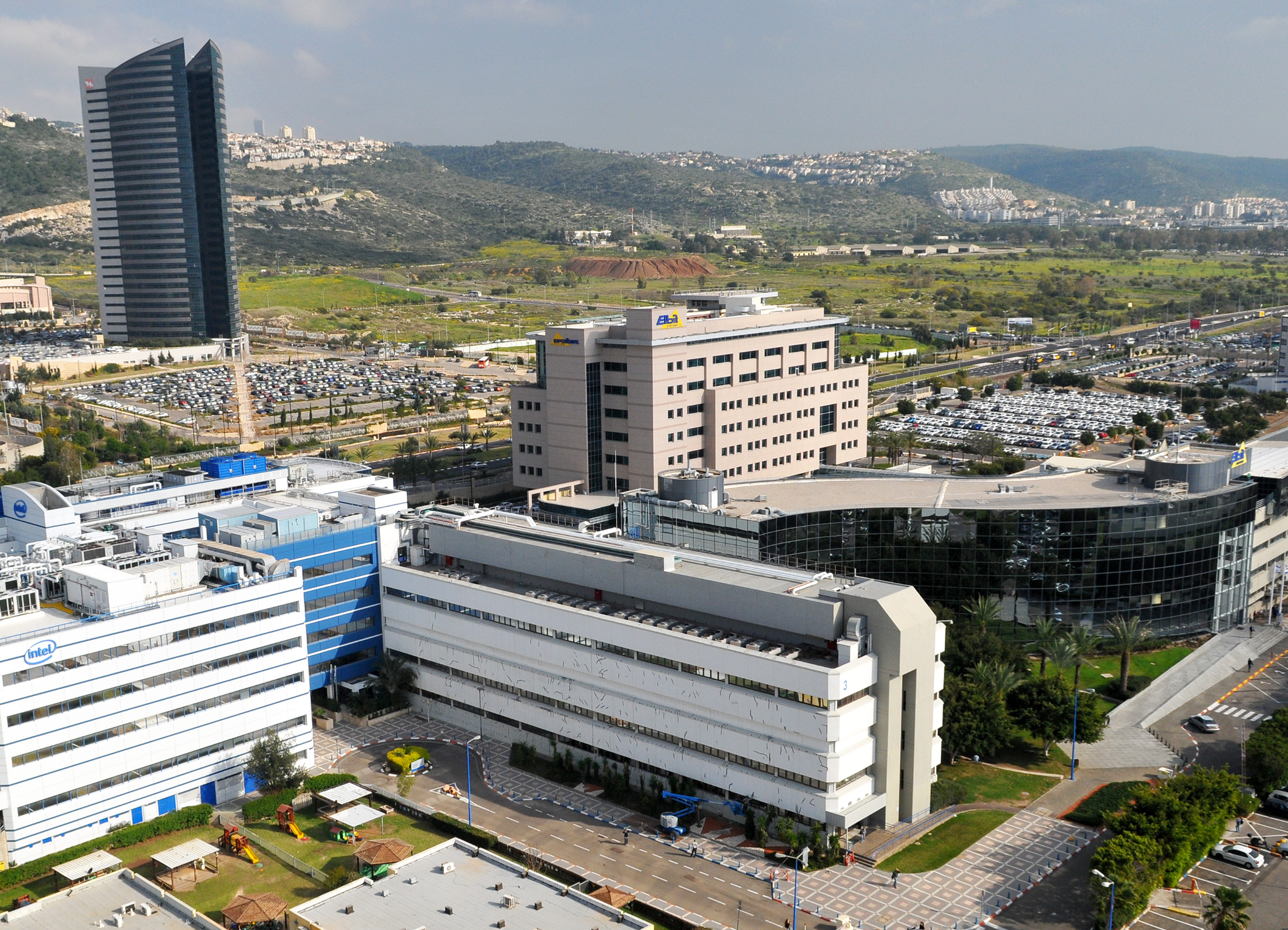
Matam hi-tech park (Haifa)

In August 2019, Elbit Systems won an Israel Ministry of Defense contract to install the Iron Fist active protection system on the IDF's new Eitan AFV and the IDF's fleet of armored D9 bulldozers.

An Elbit Hermes 450 drone was used in the 2024 World Central Kitchen aid convoy attack which killed seven aid workers in multiple missile strikes against three marked aid vehicles.

The Israeli Ministry of Defense's Defense Procurement Directorate and Cyclone, an aerostructures subsidiary of Elbit Systems, signed a contract worth more than $34 million (roughly NIS 100 million) in May 2026. The agreement assigned Cyclone the responsibility of developing and integrating external fuel tanks for the Israeli Air Force's Lockheed Martin F-35I "Adir" fighter aircraft. In order to increase the aircraft's operational range and reduce reliance on aerial refueling logistics during long-range deployments, the project modifies an existing Cyclone design that was initially built for the F-16.

In November 2026, the Elbit Systems and the Defense Ministry signed a $190 million contract for a new artillery training facility.

=== United States ===
Elbit owns several companies in the United States through its American subsidiary, Elbit Systems of America (ESA). ESA operates under a special security agreement with a proxy board, allowing it to function independently and separately from its parent company. Elbit Systems of America (ESA) is incorporated in Delaware.

In 2014, Elbit Systems won a two-year, $12.7 million contract for the supply and provision of Apache Aviator Integrated Helmets for the US Army helicopter fleet. On March 22, 2018, Elbit Systems and Universal Avionics announced that Elbit would be acquiring Universal Avionics Systems Corporation through an asset acquisition agreement. In 2019, Elbit Systems purchased the night vision business of Harris Corporation for $350 million. The purchase was conditional on Harris Corporation's merger with L3 Technologies. In April 2019, Elbit Systems announced that it had partnered with DA-Group to produce and advertise its anti-jamming devices for global navigation satellite systems.

Elbit has facilities in the United States in the following locations:

- Talladega, Alabama: IEI (formerly International Enterprises, Inc.)
- San Jose, California: VSI (VSI is a joint venture with Rockwell Collins, formerly known as Vision Systems International. Elbit and Rockwell Collins each own 50%)
- Tallahassee, Florida: Talla-Com
- Merrimack, New Hampshire: Kollsman Inc. Originally founded in 1928 by Paul Kollsman, Kollsman is a subcontractor to Boeing on SBInet, a security system for the US–Mexico border developed for the United States Department of Homeland Security.
- Fort Mill, South Carolina: UAS Dynamics. Originally a 50–50 joint venture with General Dynamics (GD) Armament and Technical Products. On December 1, 2011, Elbit purchased GD's 50% share)
- Fort Worth, Texas: Elbit Systems of America (ESA). ESA serves as the US headquarters for Elbit, and the Fort Worth facility manufactures components for the F-16, V-22, and Bradley Fighting Vehicle, among other programs. It was initially the electronics manufacturing facility for General Dynamics operations in Fort Worth; when GD sold its aviation business to Lockheed Martin, the latter was not interested in the facility which it then sold to Elbit.
- San Antonio, Texas: M7 Aerospace, formerly Fairchild Dornier Aviation
- McLean, Virginia: Innovative Concepts, Inc. (ICI). Purchased in November 2008 from Herley Industries
- Roanoke, Virginia: night vision division of the former Harris Corporation. This was purchased by Elbit in September 2019.

=== Canada ===
Elbit Systems has had a presence in Canada for over 10 years. In January 2012, Advionix Systems Ltd, a company that had been founded in 2001, renamed itself as Elbit Systems of Canada Limited. In October 2014, it was announced that Elbit had been selected by Rheinmetall Canada Inc to provide ELSAT 2100 satellite-on-the-move (SOTM) systems for the Canadian armed forces.

In December 2016, Elbit acquired Geospectrum Technologies Inc., a small technology company based in Dartmouth, Nova Scotia. In March 2018, it was announced that GeoSpectrum had delivered the first version of its Towed Reelable Active Passive Sonar (TRAPS) to the Royal Canadian Navy.

In May 2025, the Investigative Journalism Foundation reported that Elbit Systems had offered to sell Ontario drones to combat forest fires.

=== United Kingdom ===
Elbit activities in the United Kingdom started in 1995, when it acquired 'Alvis UAV Engines Limited' from Alvis plc. A company that was founded in 1992 by engineer David Garside, to develop Wankel engines for use in UAVs. Garside has been developing Wankel engines since the late 1960s for BSA motorcycles and later Norton Motorcycle Company, and had the idea of using the engines originally developed for motorcycles, for UAV's that required small but powerful source of power. Elbit, through its subsidiary 'Silver Arrow', was the company's only major customer when it was acquired. Since then the company has become a major global supplier of UAV Engines.

Its subsidiary Elbit Systems UK Ltd. was incorporated on September 24, 2004, as a holding company for Elbit's activities in the United Kingdom. The company was incorporated after Elbit and French company Thales Group won a tender (code-named "Watchkeeper program") to supply the British Army with unmanned aerial vehicles. The tender condition included a requirement to set up a local manufacturing facility for the program. Therefore, at the end of 2005, a joint venture company was established with the Thales Group. The joint venture, named UAV Tactical Systems Ltd (U-TacS), was based in Leicester and manufactured the Watchkeeper WK450. A flight testing facility was also set up at ParcAberporth in Wales.

In 2007, Elbit acquired Ferranti Technologies, based in Oldham, Greater Manchester, a company that was part of the historic Ferranti group and provided solutions in the aerospace and defence markets.

In 2010, via the acquisition of Azimuth Technologies in Israel, Elbit also came to own 100% of its UK subsidiary, Instro Precision Limited, which is engaged primarily in target acquisition and fire control systems.

In February 2016, Affinity Flying Services Limited, a joint venture between Elbit and Kellog, Brown and Root, was awarded a £500 million contract to manage the UK Military Flight Training System (UKMFTS) program for the Ministry of Defence to deliver aircrew training for over an 18-year period.

In 2021, Instro Precision was awarded a £11.5 million contract from the UK Ministry of Defence to supply XACT Night Vision Goggles to the British Armed Forces. Extensions to the contract were awarded in 2022 and 2025.

Elbit sold its Ferranti subsidiary in 2022 for £9 million, approximately £6 million less than it had purchased it for fifteen years prior. Activists attributed the sale to their years-long direct action campaign against Elbit's presence in Oldham.

Elbit opened an advanced manufacturing and development facility in Bristol in July 2023. As of 2023, Elbit has multiple UK subsidiaries across sixteen sites in the country, with more than 680 employees.

In 2024, Elbit announced the sale of the Elite KL factory in Tamworth.

In late August 2025, Elbit Systems was described by Private Eye as "close" to a gaining a 15 year, £2 billion Ministry of Defence contract training 60,000 British soldiers annually.

In January 2026, Elbit announced that it was buying Thales' 49% share in their drone manufacturing joint venture, UAV Tactical Systems. Industry commentators noted that Elbit had indicated that it planned to produce UAVs for customers across Europe from the Leicester-based factory.

As a result, Elbit Systems currently operates five businesses in the UK, four of which are wholly-owned subsidiaries and one of which is a joint venture:

- Elbit Systems UK Ltd
- UAV Engines Ltd
- UAV Tactical Systems Ltd
- Instro Precision Ltd
- Affinity Flying Services Limited (50%)

=== Germany ===
According to company information, Elbit's German operations originate in the radio communications business of Telefunken in Ulm. Following a series of corporate reorganisations involving AEG, DASA and EADS, the radio communications business was spun off in 2000 as EADS Radio Communication System GmbH & Co. KG (EADS RACOMS). In 2003, Israeli communications manufacturer Tadiran acquired a controlling interest in EADS RACOMS, which was subsequently renamed Telefunken Radio Communication Systems GmbH & Co. KG (Telefunken RACOMS).

Telefunken RACOMS became part of Elbit Systems in 2007, when Elbit completed its acquisition of Tadiran Communications. Elbit subsequently described the Ulm-based company as its wholly-owned German subsidiary, active in military and civilian communications projects in Germany and internationally. Elbit further expanded its German presence by opening an office in Berlin in 2018.

In 2020, Elbit announced that Telefunken RACOMS would be rebranded as Elbit Systems Deutschland. In March 2021, the company opened an additional office in Koblenz, joining its headquarters and development and manufacturing facility in Ulm and its Berlin office.

For the German military, Elbit produces the E-LynX SDR radio system, night vision and thermal imaging devices, and Directional Infrared Countermeasure (DIRCM) for the A400M, radar warning receivers, and EW controllers for the CH-53GS/GE.

In May 2026, Elbit Systems signed a memorandum of understanding with thyssenkrupp Marine Systems (TKMS) to expand cooperation on naval defense technologies and maritime systems. The agreement built on existing cooperation between the companies, including the manufacturing of submarine components in Israel.

Germany has also purchased several Israeli defense systems, including the Arrow-3 missile defense system and Heron TP drones.

=== Romania ===
Elbit Systems' activities in Romania, which started in 1996, are primarily carried out through its wholly owned Romanian subsidiaries, Elbit Systeme S.A., A-E Electronics S.A, Elmet International SRL and Simultec SRL, which have approximately 400 employees. On May 24, 2011, Elbit announced that its Elisra Electronic Systems Ltd. Romanian subsidiary was awarded, in cooperation with other Romanian companies and led by the Romanian Aeronautical Industry, a four-year contract valued at approximately $18.6 million to upgrade the Romanian Air Forces' C-130 transport aircraft.

=== Sweden ===
On June 17, 2021, Elbit Systems announced the establishment of its Swedish subsidiary Elbit Systems Sweden. On January 13, 2022, Elbit Systems Sweden was awarded with a contract to supply combat management systems to the Royal Swedish Navy. On January 24, 2023, Elbit Systems Sweden announced that it was awarded a contract valued at approximately $48 million to equip the Swedish Armed Forces with new mobile tactical communications stations. According to the contract, Elbit Systems Sweden is to develop and deliver two Technical High Mobility Shelter (THMS) variants, the RL HYTT 24A and RL HYTT 24B.

=== Belgium ===
On July 1, 2003, Elbit acquired the Belgian company OIP Sensor Systems, based on Oudenaarde.

In 2020, it was announced that OIP, alongside Elbit subsidiary Telefunken RACOMS based in Ulm, Germany, had been jointly awarded a contract from the French Direction générale de l'armement (DGA) to deliver approximately 2620 FN SCAR-H PR rifles plus TIGRIS clip-on sights.

=== Switzerland ===
Elbit first established a presence in Switzerland in 2019 when it announced the formation of Elbit Systems Switzerland AG on 9 September 2019. In the press release accompanying the announcement, Elbit Systems stated that the aim would be to expand the transfer of advanced technologies to the Swiss market with an initial focus on developing a Technology Center of Excellence in Communications, Command & Control, Computing and Cyber Intelligence.

Elbit Systems focuses on a number of projects in Switzerland, including:

- E-Lynx Mobile Tactical Radio solutions
- INTAFF Integrated Artillery Command and Fire Control System
- JHMCS Joint Helmet Mounted Cueing System
- Hermes 900 (known as ADS-15 in Switzerland) reconnaissance drone

In January 2026, Swiss media outlet Heidi.news reported that Neuchâtel-based Alpes Lasers appeared to be an unofficial subsidiary of Elbit Systems, with a number of Elbit executives on its board, and at lest one employee of Alpes Lasers referring to it as "Alpes Lasers, owned by Elbit Systems." In November 2026, Swiss investigative outlet Woz further reported that Alpes Lasers, a manufacturer of Quantum Coded Lasers (QCL), had obtained export licences to Israel of QCL equipment with a value of almost CHF 17 million and that these licences were part of an agreed offset against Switzerland's purchase of Hermes 900 Reconnaissance drones from Elbit. The report went on to state that shipping documents confirmed that the deliveries of QCL laser equipment to Elbit Systems in Israel had been made.

=== Australia ===
In April 2021, the Australian Army announced that Elbit's battlefield management system would be withdrawn from use with short notice, effective May 15, 2021. The Australian Broadcasting Corporation reported that this was due to concerns regarding the Elbit system's security. An Australian Financial Review columnist stated that the security problems comprised "a 'backdoor' security vulnerability reportedly uncovered by the Australian Signals Directorate". The Australian Defence Magazine reported that the system had failed two security milestones in 2020. Elbit denied that the system posed any security risks.

Despite previous concerns, the Australian Army made a US$600 million contract with Elbit Systems in 2024.

=== Brazil ===
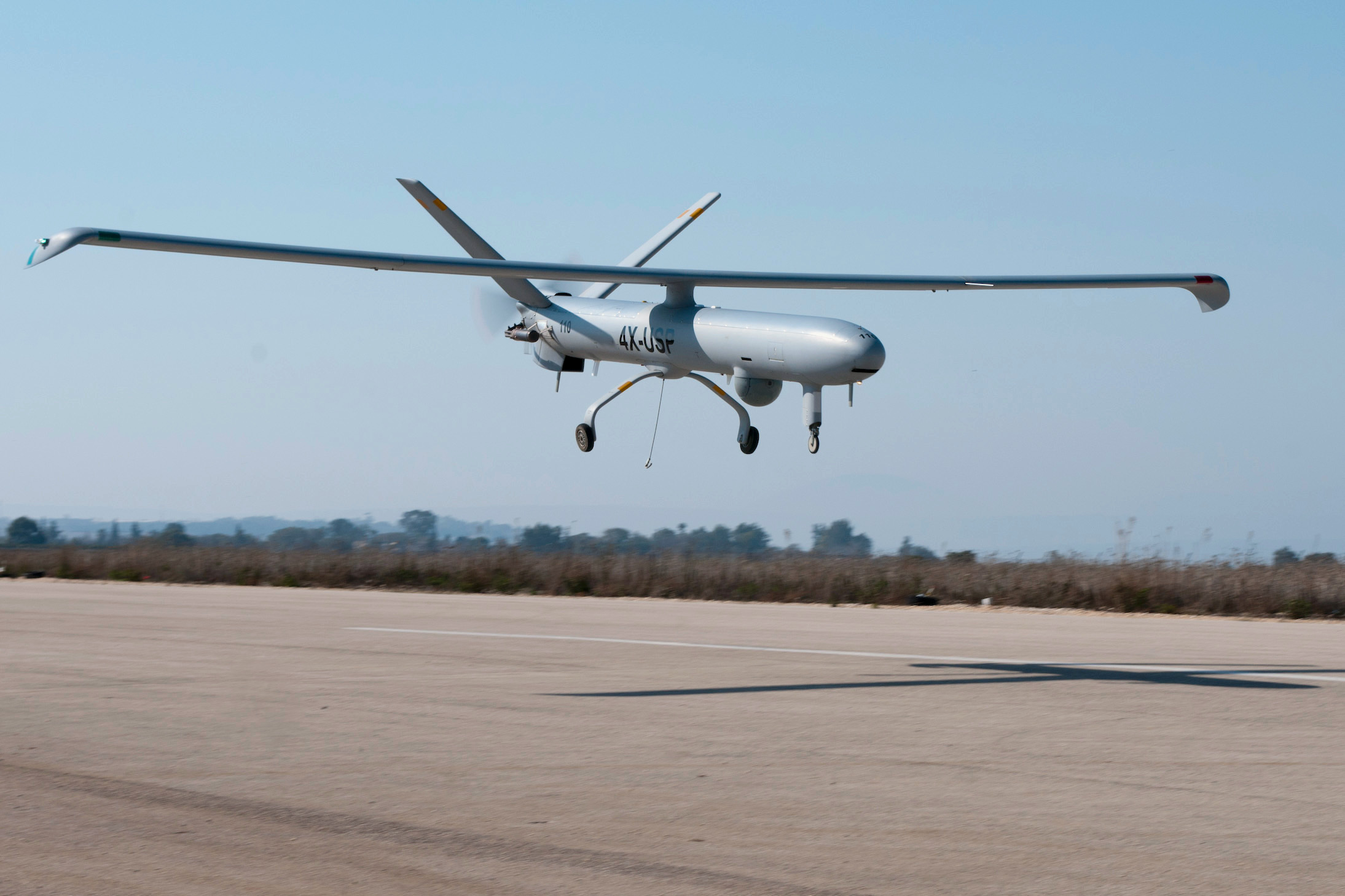
Elbit Hermes 450 unmanned aerial vehicle

In 2001, Elbit Systems Group completed its purchase of Aeroeletronica, a Brazilian company in the defense industry. In January 2011, Elbit announced that it had bought two additional Brazilian companies: Ares Aeroespecial e Defesa and Periscopio Equipamentos Optronicos. In April 2011, the Brazilian aircraft manufacturer Embraer entered into a strategic agreement with AEL Sistemas S.A, a subsidiary of Elbit Systems. According to officials from the two companies, one of the primary goals of the Embraer-majority joint venture was introduce the Elbit Systems Hermes 450 UAV into the service of the Brazilian Air Force.

=== Other international activities ===
==== France ====
On June 19, 2011, Elbit announced that its subsidiary Elisra Electronic Systems Ltd. was awarded a contract valued at approximately €5 million to supply hundreds of units of its AN/PRC-684 Personal Locator Beacon to the French Ministry of Defense, equipping the French Air Force, Army, Navy and DGA (Direction Générale de l'Armement).

==== Greece ====
In May 2021, an agreement was reached after a government-to-government negotiation for the establishment of the International Flight Training Center within the Kalamata Air Base premises in Kalamata, Greece. The €1.375 billion deal includes a 22-year public-private partnership with Elbit Systems to modernize Greece's pilot training capabilities.

==== Italy ====
On June 22, 2011, Elbit announced that it was awarded a three-year, US$15 million contract by Elettronica S.p.A. to participate in a program to supply the ELT/572 DIRCM system for installation on various platforms of the Italian Air Force, including the C130J, C27J and AW101.

==== Azerbaijan ====
Israel supplies Azerbaijan advanced military equipment and helps train its army. As a part of the cooperation between the two states, Elbit Systems opened an office in Azerbaijan in 2011, with plans to build a plant for the joint production of unmanned aerial vehicles. In 2023, it was reported that Elbit (along with other Israeli defense manufacturers) had played an extensive role in discreetly arming the Azerbaijani army for the Nagorno-Karabakh conflict that culminated in accusations of an Armenian genocide.

==== Japan ====
In March 2023, Elbit entered a strategic partnership with Itochu Aviation and Nippon Aircraft Supply. Itochu ended the partnership in February 2024 on advisement from Japan's foreign ministry following the ICJ provisional order in South Africa's genocide case against Israel.

==== Philippines ====
Elbit won its first contract in the Philippines for the supply of upgraded armored personnel carriers to the Philippine military in June 2014. The upgrade included 25-mm unmanned turrets, 12.7-mm remote controlled weapon stations (, and fire control systems for 90-mm turrets. In 2015, the Armed Forces of the Philippines received 114 M113 tracked APCs from the United States, with remote control weapons systems designed by Elbit.

On October 23, 2020, Elbit won contracts to produce 18 Sabrah ASCOD Light Tanks and 10 Pandur II Tank Destroyers along with 1 ASCOD 2 Armored Command Vehicle, 1 ASCOD, and 2 Armored Recovery Vehicles, as well as another contract to supply 28 Iveco VBTP-MR Guarani APCs for the Philippine Army's Light Tank and APC Acquisition Projects.

== Controversies ==
=== Colombia bribery allegations ===
In March 2010, a $28-million contract for Hermes 450 UAVs was suspended by the Colombian government after media reports based on anonymous letters alleged that Colombian officials had been bribed. The Israeli Ministry of Defense investigated and found that the letters likely came from Israel Aerospace Industries, a competitor that lost the tender. The incident led to a review of the regulations governing overseas competition between Israeli defense companies.

=== Alleged surveillance of Ethiopian dissidents ===
On December 6, 2017, the Citizen Lab reported that Ethiopian dissidents and journalists in the US, UK, and other countries were targeted by sophisticated commercial spyware, sold and operated by Cyberbit, a wholly owned subsidiary of Elbit Systems. Ronald Deibert, director of the Citizen Lab, said "the findings raised questions about the company's human rights due-diligence practices and processes for preventing misuse of its software." In a reply to an inquiry from Human Rights Watch on the topic, Cyberbit did not deny selling this kind of technology, and rejected responsibility for its possible misuse on its customers.

=== NATO corruption investigation ===
The NATO affiliated procurement agency barred Elbit from receiving arms contracts since May 2025, due an ongoing corruption investigation.

=== Ethical concerns and divestment ===
On September 3, 2009, the Government Pension Fund of Norway's ethical council decided to sell the fund's stocks in Elbit due to the company's supply of surveillance systems for the Israeli West Bank barrier. At a press conference to announce the decision, Minister of Finance Kristin Halvorsen said "We do not wish to fund companies that so directly contribute to violations of international humanitarian law". The Norwegian Ambassador to Israel, Hans Jacob Biørn Lian, was called to a meeting at the Israeli Foreign Ministry where the decision was protested.

In January 2010, Danske Bank added Elbit to the list of companies that fail its Socially Responsible Investment policy. A bank spokesman noted that it was acting in the interests of its customers by not "placing their money in companies that violate international standards". The Danish financial watchdog DanWatch placed Elbit on its ethical blacklist in 2011. In 2014, one of Denmark's largest pension fund administrators PKA Ltd announced it will no longer consider investing in Elbit, stating "The ICJ stated that the barrier only serves military purposes and violates Palestinian human rights. Therefore we have looked at whether companies produce custom-designed products to the wall and thus has a particular involvement in repressive activities."

In March 2010, a Swedish pension fund, not wanting to be associated with companies violating international treaties, boycotted Elbit Systems for its involvement in the construction of Israel's West Bank barrier wall.

In December 2018, HSBC divested from Elbit following Elbit's acquisition of IMI Systems. HSBC cited IMI's manufacturing of cluster bombs, which violated the bank's ethics policy of not investing in companies linked to the manufacturing or marketing of cluster munition.

In 2019, Axa partially divested from Elbit Systems following pressure from the Boycott, Divestment and Sanctions movement. The move followed several years of campaigning by NGOs, including an April 2018 petition launched by SumOfUs that received 140,000 signatures. Axa "quietly reduce[d]" its investments in Elbit and Israeli banks. Axa remains indirectly invested in Elbit and Israeli banks through a non-controlling interest in its former subsidiary Alliance Bernstein.

=== Instro Precision and Touche Ltd ===
In August 2026, UK Investigative magazine Private Eye reported that around a fifth of the controlled military and dual use goods sent from the UK to Israel in 2023 and 2024 - including technology for military aircraft and the conversion of manned to unmanned aircraft - had been exported by an Israeli couple working out of a house in cul-de-sac in Kent. According to the article, Touche Ltd, founded in 2019 by a lead engineer for Elbit's UK subsidiary Instro Precision, was granted an Open Individual Export Licence in 2022 to export military equipment to Israel in 2022, has no employees, no website, no contact details and files only micro-company accounts, and has a registered address only a short distance from Instro's factory in Sandwich, Kent.

=== Belgian seizures and allegations of illegal shipments ===
==== October 2025 seizures ====
In October 2025, four crates of radar and electronics parts for UAVs from Renens-based company SwissTo12, with consignee Elbit Systems in Israel, were intercepted and seized by Belgian customs authorities in Bierset Airport in Liège while transiting from Zurich to Tel Aviv. The region of Walloon within Belgium has had an embargo on military shipments to Israel since 2009, and is not issuing any export or transit permits to Israel for goods which might "increase Israel's military capability."

In 2021 it had been announced that Elbit and SwissTo12 were partnering on the development and production of specialist RF antennas and subsystems for Elbit Systems’ Naval EW programs.

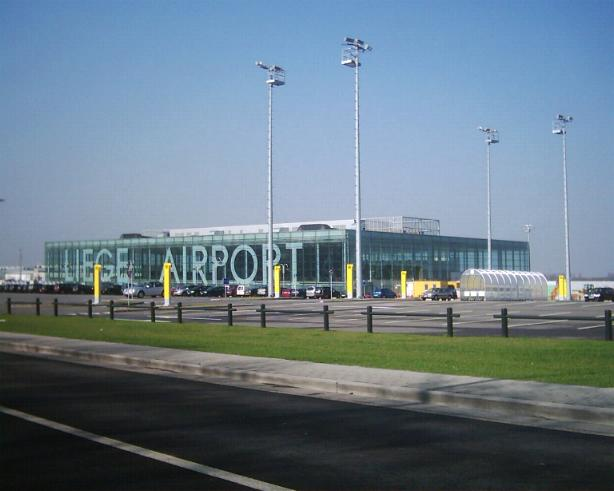
Liege airport

==== April 2026 seizures ====
In April 2026, Belgian authorities reported the interception of two separate shipments of military-related equipment at Liège Airport that had originated in the United Kingdom and were destined for Elbit Systems in Israel. Belgian media reported that the cargo was inspected following concerns that it contained controlled military items, and that once it had been determined that the shipments contained parts for military aircraft, laser targeting and fire control systems, a criminal investigation had been opened to determine whether export control or transit regulations had been breached.

According to Walloon minister-president, Adrien Dolimont, “We have to see if the legislation has been respected. Here, in this case, it's clear that it hasn't. No transit licence was requested; if it had been, it would have been refused”.

Statements from the Belgian government and media reports identified one of the seized shipments as coming from the Wolverhampton factory of Moog Inc., a US defense supplier, and bound for Israel's M-346 fast jet trainer program. In May 2026, UK investigative newspaper Private Eye published allegations that, subsequent to the April 2026 seizures in Liège Airport, Moog's Wolverhampton facility continued to ship M-346 components to Elbit Systems along flight paths that overflew Belgian airspace, in apparent breach of the 16 January 2026 Royal Decree prohibiting use of Belgian airspace for any flights containing military materiel for use by the Israeli armed forces.

=== French airport cargo workers action ===
In October 2026, following information provided by Palestine research organisations Urgence Palestine and Palestinian Youth Movement, a shipment of alleged planetary gearbox components for military vehicles from Mijno Engineering to Elbit Systems Land in Israel was held up at Charles de Gaulle airport in Paris.

According to Israeli news outlet N12, the shipment was originally scheduled to be transported on an Air France flight on 8 October, but following pressure from cargo workers unions, the air shipment was cancelled, with Air France publicly denying that any such booking had existed. The shipment was subsequently rebooked on an El-Al flight scheduled for 10 October, but on 9 October it emerged that cargo workers were refusing to load the shipment and a legal challenge had been made to the Administrative Court and the Presidential Office.

On 11 October, The Times of Israel reported that the cargo had departed on the 10 October flight, quoting El Al as saying that Elbit had decided not to send the cargo on the flight. El Al went on to deny knowledge of where the cargo was currently located.

== Protest activity ==
=== Czech Republic ===
In March 2026, a warehouse in Pardubice was destroyed by arson. The building was owned by LPP Holding, a drone manufacturing company. The warehouse had been publicized as a "Centre of Excellence" for building drones in partnership with Elbit Systems, however company spokesman said that the operations had not initiated. The fire was extinguished without threat of public harm and no people were injured. A group called the Earthquake Faction claimed responsibility for the attack, stating that the facility was targeted due to LPP Holding's planned cooperation with Elbit.

=== Germany ===
In 2025, Elbit Germany saw several protests such as a protest camp in April, banners hung on the Ulm Minster in July, demonstrations in August demanding the closure of Elbit’s German locations.

In September 2025, activists who were allegedly associated with Palestine Action Germany were arrested after breaking in and damaging property at the Elbit plant in Ulm, Germany. The protestors, who have since been in pre-trial detention, maintain that their goal was to highlight the complicity of Elbit Systems in the killing of Gazan civilians. The lawyer of the 'Ulm 5' has called for the immediate release of the activists and an investigation into the close involvement of Elbit in war crimes, crimes against humanity, and genocide in Gaza.

=== United Kingdom ===
Following the 2014 Gaza War, activists began protesting outside Ferranti's factory, primarily against Elbit's production of various bombs and other military technology used by the Israeli Air Force and resulting in Palestinian casualties. Activists particularly cited Elbit's production of the Hermes drone, which was involved in the deaths of at least four Palestinian children.

During the 2021 Israel–Palestine crisis, on May 19, 2021, four members of Palestine Action dressed in red boiler suits and climbed onto the roof of an Elbit Systems-owned drone factory in Meridian Business Park, Leicester. The occupation lasted 6 days, and a total of 10 arrests were made for conspiracy to commit criminal damage and aggravated trespass. Palestine Action group has staged similar occupations of Elbit Systems sites in Bristol, Oldham in collaboration with Extinction Rebellion, and Tamworth in collaboration with Animal Rebellion.

Beginning in October 2023, when the Gaza war began, several Elbit factories were protested by activists with Palestine Action. At the Instro Precision Factory in Sandwich, Kent, more than 100 people blocked the entrances. In Leicester, several activists climbed on the roof of the Howmet Fastening Systems factory, and a single protester chained themself to the entrance of the U-TacS factory.

On 6 August 2024, 6 activists drove a repurposed prison van into Elbit's compound at Aztec West, breached security fences, entered the facility and caused substantial damage to property and equipment. The action also involved confrontations with security personnel and police, during the course of which a police officer sustained a fracture to her lumbar spine. Six activists were arrested at the scene and there were raids on homes subsequently. The Crown Prosecution Service used powers under the Terrorism Act to detain seven activists after the incident. 24 people were eventually charged.

In September 2024, the London headquarters of APCO Worldwide was targeted by Palestine Action over its representation of the UK interests of Elbit Systems.

In the UK Elbit have attempted to coordinate with the UK government to suppress illegal destructive activity against their offices and factories, especially in relation to the Palestine Action direct action network. Reporting in The Guardian showed attempted coordination between Elbit and the Embassy of Israel with the Home Office, Attorney General for England and Wales and Crown Prosecution Service regarding the prosecution of Palestine Action activists, dating back to April 2022. In August 2020, one month after the emergence of Palestine Action, then UK foreign secretary Dominic Raab met with Orit Farkash-Hacohen, Israel's former minister of strategic affairs, who "pressed Raab on direct action protests against Israeli companies in Britain, noting how “the London offices of Elbit Systems” had been attacked for the fourth time in as many weeks." In 2022, then-Home Secretary Priti Patel met with Martin Fausset, the CEO of Elbit UK to “discuss protests and security”. The meeting produced a series of suggested actions, which were entirely redacted when the document was made public under FOI.

In 2025, following a sustained campaign of direct action by groups, including Palestine Action, which targeted their offices with protests and occupations, both Allianz and Aviva terminated their insurance contracts with Elbit's UK subsidiaries. Allianz ended its coverage of Elbit Systems UK, while Aviva ceased insuring UAV Engines.

=== United States ===
In response to the Gaza war, protesters chained themselves to the entrance of Elbit's office in Cambridge, Massachusetts, on October 12. Later that month, protesters from Palestine Action US claimed to have completely shut down the company's operations in an incident resulting in nine arrests. The Cambridge office closed in August 2024 following weekly protests.

In November 2023, three protesters were arrested for vandalism at an Elbit location in Merrimack, New Hampshire. According to an NBC News report, the "Merrimack Fire Department was also called to the scene due to a report of smoke coming from the roof [...] at least one of the main lobby doors had been locked shut with a bicycle lock." Elbit's institutional shareholders were also subject to pro-Palestine protests with demands for companies targeted, including BNY Mellon and JPMorgan Chase, to divest from the company and sell their stock in the Israeli defense company.

== See also ==
- Rafael Advanced Defense Systems
- Elta Systems
- Economy of Israel
- Science and technology in Israel
