= Ulm 5 =

German pro-Palestine direct action group

The Ulm 5 are a group of five defendants that are currently on trial for breaking into and damaging the Ulm offices of Elbit Systems. They are charged with trespassing and destruction of property, as well as membership of a criminal organization due to their alleged connection with Palestine Action Germany. The five defendants are Daniel Tatlow-Devally (32, Irish), Zo Hailu (25, British), Crow Tricks (25, British), Vi Kovarbasic (29, German), and Leandra Rollo (40, Argentinian/Spanish).

The trial began on 27 April 2026, at the Stuttgart Higher Regional Court, in the grounds of Stammheim prison.

== Events ==
On 8 September 2025, the group filmed themselves breaking into and defacing the German offices of Elbit Systems. They vandalized the building using red paint and smoke grenades, broke windows, and destroyed office equipment and measurement devices.

The group called the police on themselves, and waited inside the premises to be apprehended. They are estimated to have caused damage worth between 200,000 and 1,000,000 Euros.

== Detention and trial ==
The case was handed over to Germany's Security and Counter-Terrorism Center. In addition to destruction of property, the group is being charged with membership of a criminal organization, a charge which carries a maximum sentence of five years. The Chief Prosecutor of Stuttgart has called for the court to consider their motivations and objectives antisemitic, while the defense states that the incident was civil disobedience aimed at stopping the Gaza Genocide and actions by the German government that violate international law.

The trial was to begin on 27 April 2026, but was halted when the defense team refused to be seated apart from their clients, who were separated from the rest of the court by security glass.

An Irish cross-party delegation of politicians visited Daniel Tatlow-Devally, the Irish defendant, in prison and attended a hearing in Stuttgart in July 2026. It urged the Irish government to raise concerns with Germany over access to legal representation, solitary confinement, prolonged detention, and the unusually harsh conditions of the detention of the defendants. They furthermore called for official observers to attend the trial.

The trial was set in the Stuttgart-Stammheim Prison court, famous for its construction and use in response to the Red Army Faction, which the defendants lawyers have argued gives the impression they are "dangerous individuals", and amounts to “a pre-judgement of the defendants”, Benjamin Düsberg, representing the accused Irish activist Tatlow-Devally was quoted by +972 Magazine as stating “This is about sending a signal: that direct action — especially when it targets the military-industrial complex — will be met with the full force of the state,” continuing, “In a normal case, you wouldn’t see months of pre-trial detention for property damage and trespassing.” Whilst some in civil-society have gone so as far as to compare to the atmosphere more broadly to the Radikalenerlass (Radicals Decree) of that same era.

The trial is expected to run through the end of July and to conclude in January 2027.

=== Trial ===
The trial started on 27 April, from the outset described by press as a 'tense standoff' between the defence team and presiding judge Kathrin Lauchstädt in which the legal team argued that communication with their clients was made impossibly by, among other things, a 'thick glass barrier separating the defendants form their layers' in violation with the European Convention on Human Rights. Judge Lauchstädt 'repeatedly curtailed the defense’s ability to speak', stating she'd 'no longer accept any of the motions raised at the outset of the trial', that “I did not give you the floor. Everything you say is irrelevant. It is not part of these proceedings”, as well as telling defense lawyer Anna Busl that “You do not decide what goes into the protocol — only I do,” all of this leading the legal team to collectively leave the courtroom in protest, filing a 'recusal motion' against Judge Lauchstädt, stating that she “undermined the core principles of a fair trial.”

Once the trial continued after a break the defence team in an act of protests took seats behind the thick security glass, when the defence team refused to return to their assigned seats in-front of the glass the court session was adjourned. Defence team member Matthias Schuster called their action 'an attempt to push back against a trial setup that “needlessly obstructs the defense” and carries a “stigmatizing effect.”'. Paula Zimmermann, of Amnesty International Germany, spoke to +972 Magazine, describing the trial as “extraordinarily far-reaching,” that it “risks placing legitimate civil society engagement in proximity to organized crime”, potentially having a “significant chilling effects” potentially deterring people from 'exercising their rights to freedom of expression and assembly'. Following the adjournment the defence team read out their prepared statements for the court to supports of the Ulm 5 in the prison parking lot.
