= Jack PC =

Computing device

Jack PC is a thin client device that is approximately the size of a network wall port. Its design allows for one's monitor, keyboard & mouse to plug straight into the wall-mounted unit. Jack PC operates in an SBC (Server Based Computing) environment.

The Jack PC thin client computers are connected at the back side through Ethernet cables to the building's LAN and receive Power over Ethernet (or 802.3af) through the existing enterprise infrastructure.

Jack PC is also notable in that it consumes very little power. Some tests have found it to consume as little as 5 W, not counting monitor and other external peripherals.

== See also ==
- Thin clients
- Chip PC
