= Chip PC Technologies =

- Company type: Public (TASE: CPPC)
- Industry: Computer Systems, IT
- Founded: 2000
- Headquarters: Rehovot, Israel
- Key people: Dan AMSELLEM (CEO)
- Products: Thin clients
- Revenue: ▲ ₪ 42.440 million (2017)
- Net income: ▲ ₪ 2.523 million (2017)
- Subsidiaries: Chip PC Technologies GmbH (Germany), Chip PC TEchnologies Inc. (U.S.A.)
- Website: www.chippc.com

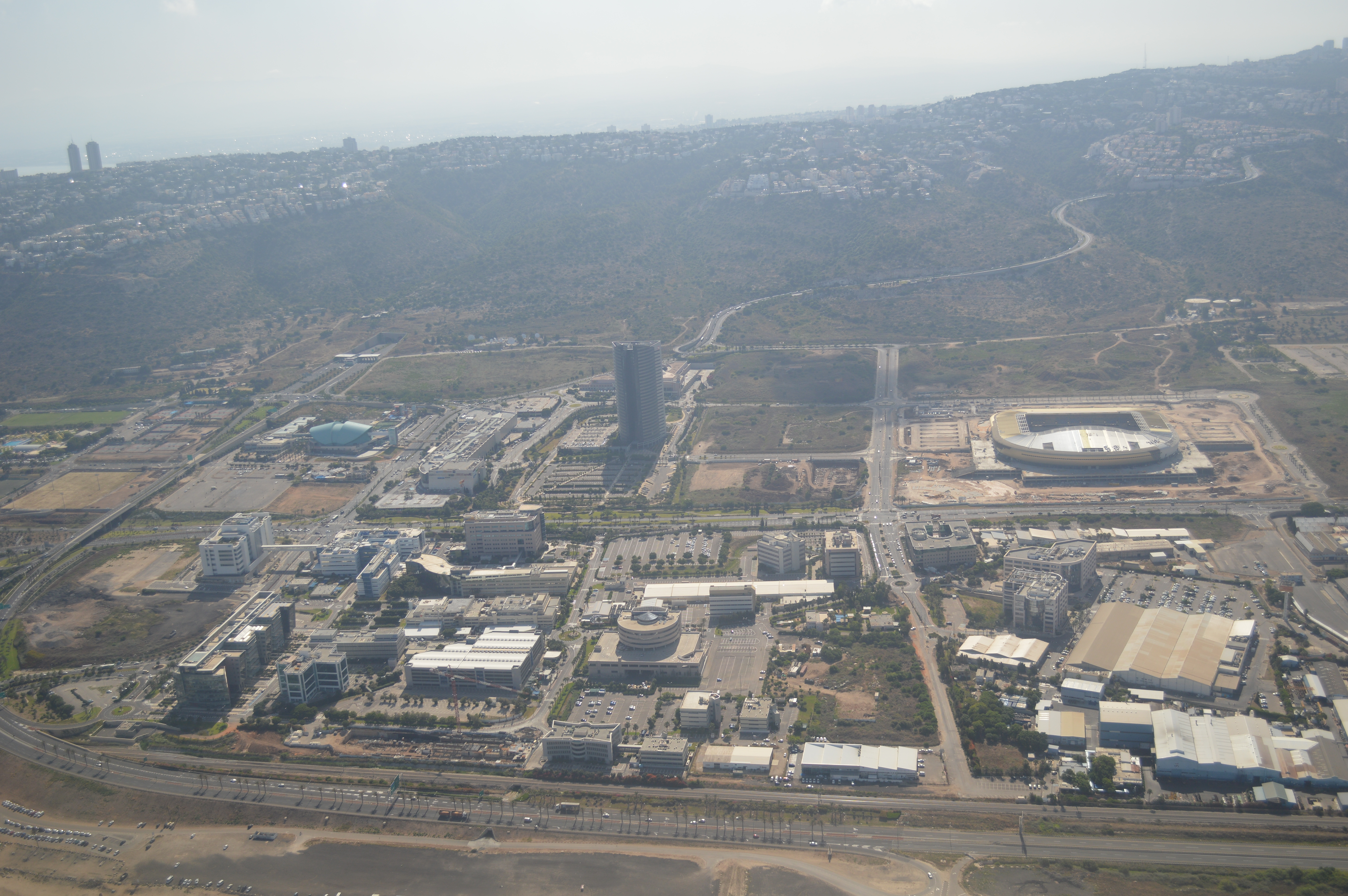
Aerial view of Matam Technology park, location of ChipPC's headquarters

Chip PC Technologies is a developer and manufacturer of thin client solutions and management software for server-based computing; where in a network architecture applications are deployed, managed and can be fully executed on the server.

== History ==
Chip PC was founded in 2000 by Aviv Soffer and Ora Meir Soffer and raised its first round of financing from R.H. Technologies Ltd. (TASE: RHTCH), an electronics contract manufacturing group.

In 2005 Elbit Systems acquired 20% of the company.

Later, the company established partnerships with Dell, which distributes its products, and Microsoft. In June 2007, it raised NIS 26 million in stocks, bonds, and warrants in an IPO on the Tel Aviv Stock Exchange.

In November 2007, the company won Europe's largest Thin client tender thus far, to supply 20,000 Thin client PC's and management software to RZF, the tax authority of the State of North Rhine-Westphalia in Germany.

== Overview ==
Chip PC supplies thin clients to Multinational & Public sector organizations, recently winning 1st place in an independent Thin-Clients Evaluation among 26 thin clients from 9 vendors worldwide. Among Chip PC customers are top organizations from various verticals, such as Healthcare, Finance, Defense (Israeli Navy), Government (US Police), and Education.

Although the company's main target markets are enterprises and large organizations, it modifies and customizes models to fit other markets; such as the Networked home, SOHO (Small-Office-Home-Office), Point of sale and others.

== See also ==
- Mini PC
- Jack PC
