= Meuleman =

Meuleman is a Dutch surname meaning "mill man". It originally could have referred to a miller or to someone who lived near a wind or water mill. Among variant forms are Meulemans, Meulman(s) and Moleman(s). People with this name include:

- August Meuleman (1906–2000), Belgian racing cyclist
- Brent Meuleman (born 1988), Belgian politician
- Brice Meuleman (1862–1924), Belgian missionary in British India and Archbishop of Calcutta
- Elisabeth Meuleman (born 1975), Belgian politician
- Jack Meuleman (1894–1964), Australian footballer
- Ken Meuleman (1923–2004), Australian cricketer, son of Jack
- Maurice Meuleman (1934–1998), Belgian racing cyclist
- Robert Meuleman (born 1949), Australian cricketer, son of Ken
- Scott Meuleman (born 1980), Australian cricketer, son of Scott
- Jens Meuleman

Meulemans

- Arthur Meulemans (1884–1966), Belgian composer, conductor, and music teacher
- Jeannine Meulemans (born 1951), Belgian judoka
- Karel Meulemans (born 1934), Belgian pigeon fancier

Meulman

- Jacqueline Meulman (b. 1954), Dutch psychologist
- Niels Shoe Meulman (b. 1967), Dutch visual artist, graffiti writer, graphic designer and art director

Moleman(s)

- Jos Molemans (1938–1994), Belgian historian, toponymist, and dialectologist
- Peter Moleman (born 1948), Dutch pharmacologist
