= Moleman =

Moleman may refer to:

- Hans Moleman, recurring character in the animated television series The Simpsons
- Mole people
- Mole Man a supervillain by Marvel Comics
- A character from The Moleman of Belmont Avenue American comedy horror film
- Roy Ralph Moleman Guacamole Guadalupe Hidalgo Estrada or Roy Estrada, American musician
- William Lyttle, nicknamed "The Mole Man of Hackney"

== See also ==
- Mole Men (disambiguation)
