= Ted Sivies =

Australian rules footballer

Personal information
- Full name: Edward Alexander Sivies
- Born: 17 June 1902; Williamstown, Victoria
- Died: 14 July 1951 (aged 49); Yarraville, Victoria
- Original team: Footscray (VFA)

Playing career^{1}
Years	Club	Games (Goals)
1924	South Melbourne	1 (0)
- ^{1} Playing statistics correct to the end of 1924.

Edward Alexander Sivies (17 June 1902 – 14 July 1951) was an Australian rules footballer who played with South Melbourne in the Victorian Football League (VFL).

== Family ==
The son of Alexander Sivies (1875–1943), and Henrietta Elisabeth Sivies (1881–1954), née Wooster, Edward Alexander Sivies was born at Williamstown, Victoria on 17 June 1902.

He married Alice Maude Cook (1901–1991) in 1924.

== Football ==
Originally from the Williamstown Juniors in the Victorian Junior Football Association, Sivies began his senior career at Footscray in the Victorian Football Association (VFA), signing with the club and assuming the full back position in the club's 1923 premiership campaign, in the absence of regular full back Jack Meuleman who missed the season with illness. Upon Meuleman's return in 1924 — and with Sivies not selected in the Footscray list of players for the 1924 season — Sivies sought a clearance to VFL club South Melbourne. It was granted on 14 May 1924. After a single game and less than two months with the club, he was cleared again, this time to VFA club Port Melbourne where he played in late 1924.

== Death ==
He died at Yarraville, Victoria on 14 July 1951.
