= Jack Meuleman =

Australian rules footballer

Personal information
- Full name: John Meuleman
- Born: 17 January 1894; Walhalla, Victoria
- Died: 16 December 1964 (aged 70); Footscray, Victoria
- Height: 179 cm (5 ft 10 in)
- Weight: 84 kg (185 lb)

Playing career^{1}
Years	Club	Games (Goals)
1920–1924	Footscray (VFA)	65 (0)
1925	Footscray	7 (0)
- ^{1} Playing statistics correct to the end of 1925.

Jack Meuleman (17 January 1894 – 16 December 1964) was an Australian rules footballer who played with Footscray in the Victorian Football Association (VFA) and Victorian Football League (VFL). His son Ken Meuleman went on to play cricket for Australia, and both his grandson Robert Meuleman and great-grandson Scott Meuleman played first class cricket for Western Australia.
