= Israeli Combat Engineering Corps =

Combat Engineering Corps
- חיל ההנדסה הקרבית
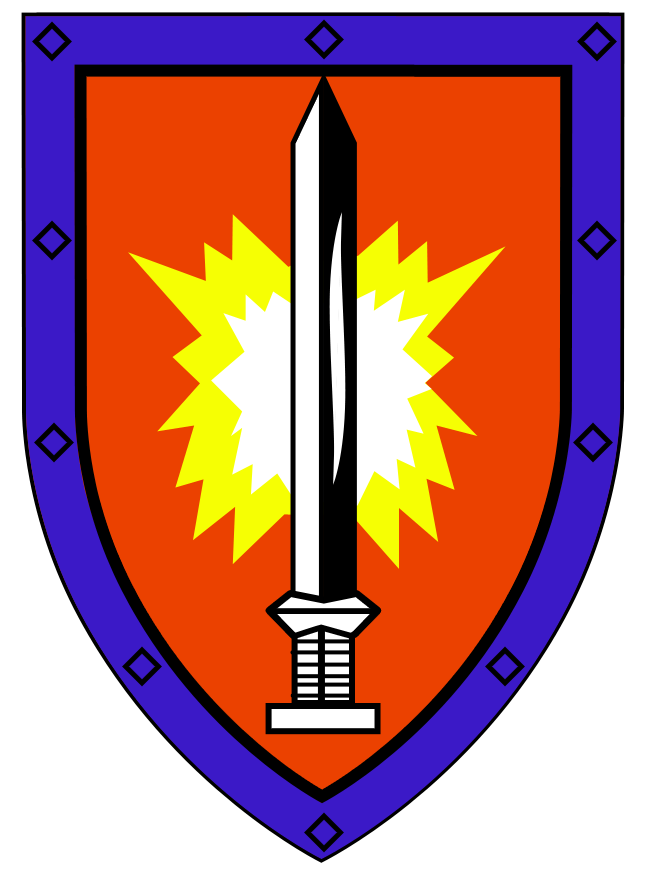
- Israeli Combat Engineering Corps insignia
- Active: 1947–today
- Country: Israel
- Allegiance: Israel Defense Forces
- Branch: Israeli Ground Forces
- Type: Combat Engineering
- Role: Combat Engineering, EOD, counter-NBC
- Part of: Maneuvering Corps; GOC Army Headquarters
- Nicknames: "Muhandesim", "Palasim", "Ksoofim"
- Mottos: "Rishonim Tamid" ("Always First"), "Rishonim BaHazit" ("First in the Front"), "Lech Beyekvot Haksufim" ("Follow the Silver ones")
- Colors: Silver berets
- March: "Handasa Kravit Theme"
- Mascot: Panther
- Engagements: All of Israel's wars, notable are: Suez Crisis; Yom Kippur War (Operation Abirey Lev – breaching the Suez Canal); Second Intifada (Battle of Jenin), 2006 Lebanon War; Gaza War (2008–2009); 2012 Israeli operation in the Gaza Strip; 2014 Gaza War; Gaza war
- Decorations: Israel Defense Prize

Commanders
- Current commander: Brigadier General Ido Mizrahi
- Notable commanders: Emmanuel Shachar, Elchanan Klein, Avishay Katz, Shimon Daniel, Moshe Sheli

Insignia
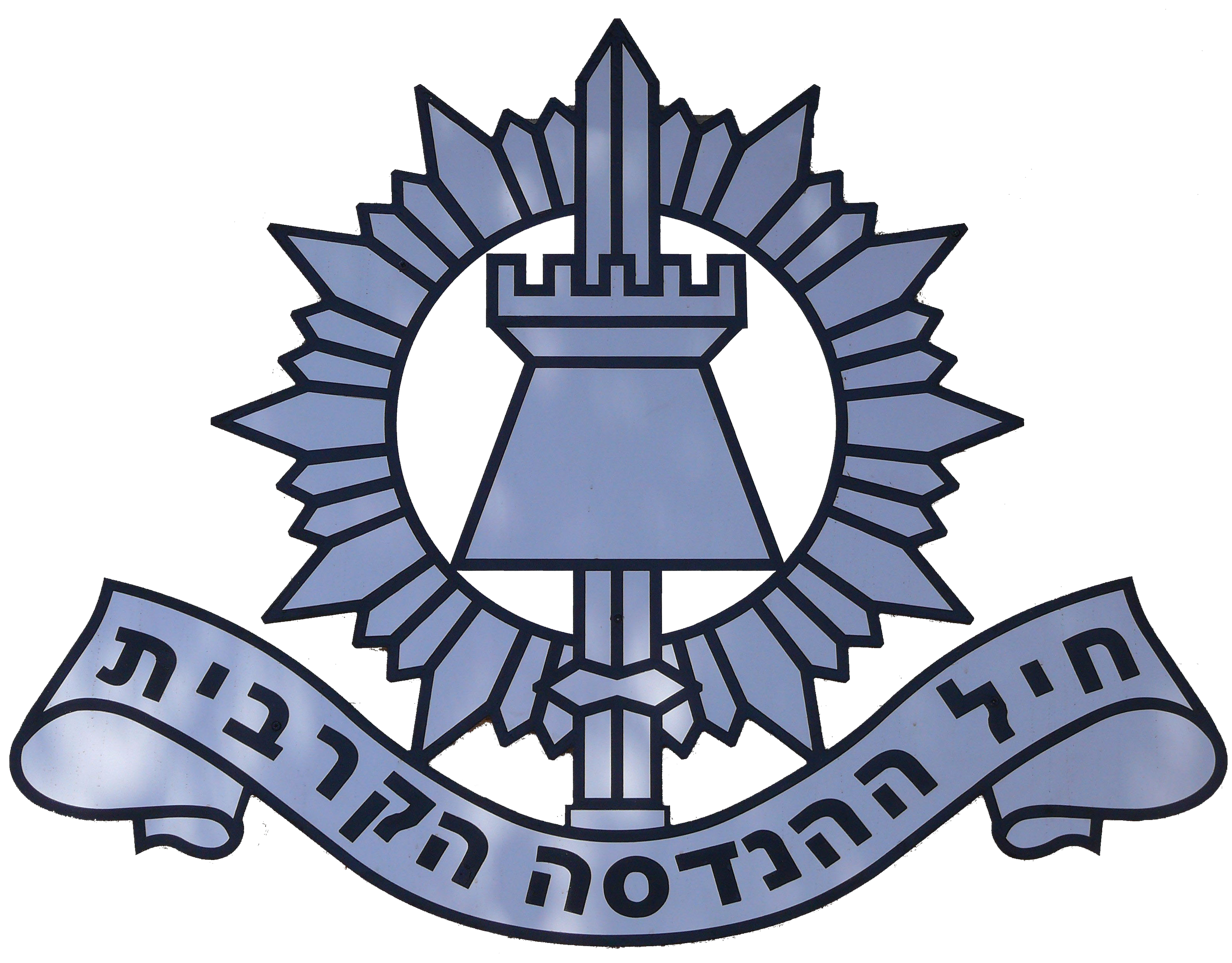
- Emblem

- Flag

The Combat Engineering Corps (Hebrew: חיל ההנדסה הקרבית, romanized: Heil HaHandasa HaKravit) is part of the Israel Defense Forces with responsibility for infantry combat, counter terrorism missions, counter-mobility of enemy forces, destruction under fire, sabotage, explosives, bomb disposal, counter-weapons of mass destruction (NBC) and special engineering missions. It is one of the most decorated front line fighting forces in the IDF.

The Combat Engineering Corps beret's color is silver and its symbol features a sword on a defensive tower with an explosion halo on the background. The Combat Engineering Corps mottos are "Always First" (ראשונים תמיד Rishonim Tamid) and the unofficial "The hard, we shall do today; the impossible, we shall do tomorrow".

In addition to Combat Engineering Corps sappers, each infantry brigade has an engineering company trained with basic engineering and explosive ordnance disposal (EOD) skills (called פלח"הן). Combat Engineering Corps sappers and heavy equipment operators are often attached to other units (such as armored or infantry brigades) in order to help them breach through obstacles and handle explosive threats.

== Roles ==
Beside extensive training in basic combat engineering, combat engineers receive specialized training in their respective professions. These are:

- Sapper: trained with all the basic engineering skills and also trained at high infantry level (רובאי 07). Their main role is to breach through terrain obstacles (natural and artificial), breach through minefields and enable ground forces to advance in the battlefield. They are trained to supply close combat support for both armored fighting vehicles and infantry. Some of them are trained in driving the Combat Engineering Corps standard CEV: the IDF Puma. Their professional ranks after advanced training are Rifleman 07 (רובאי 07) and Sapper 06 (פלס 06).

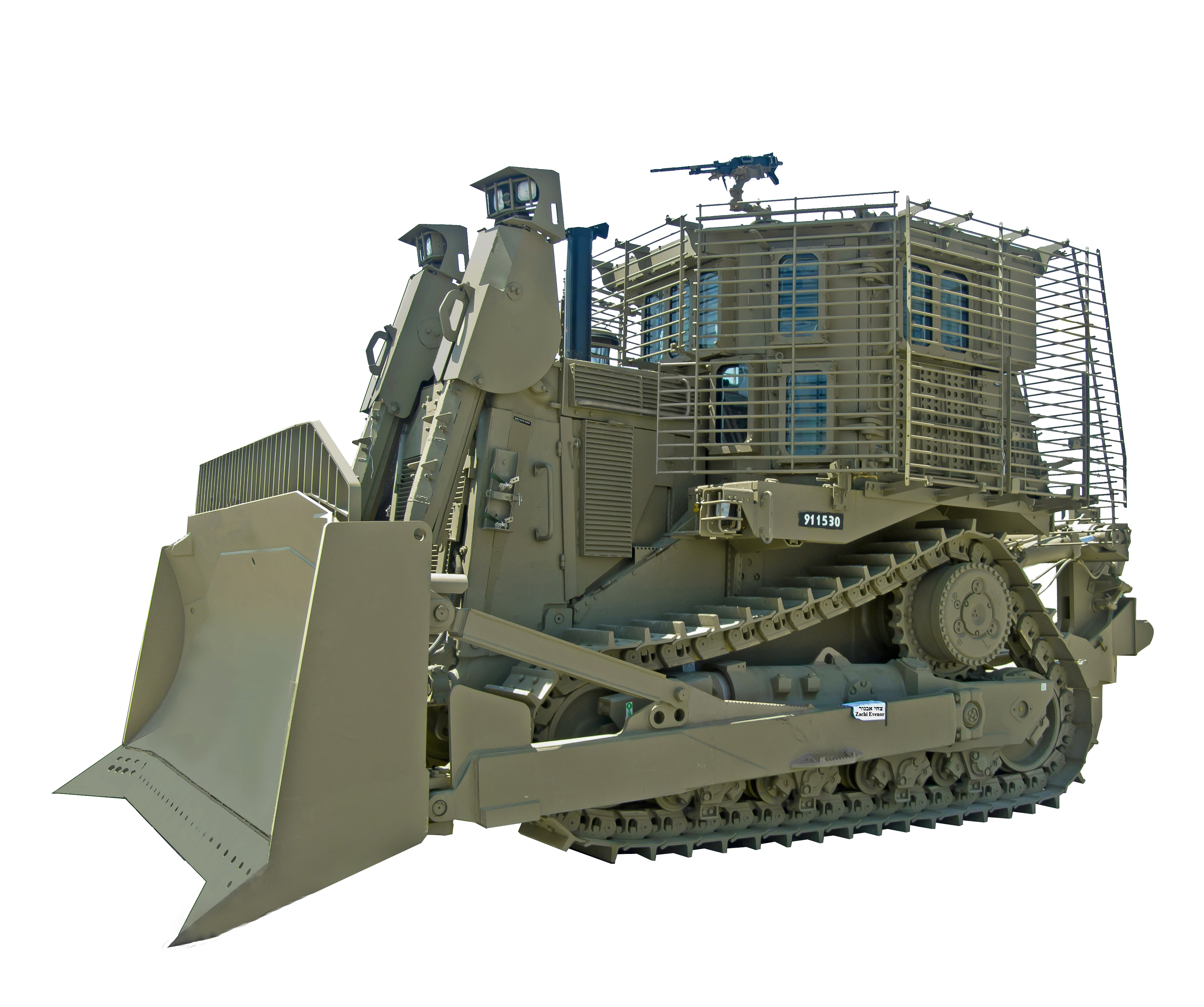
IDF Caterpillar D9

- Engineering Vehicles Operator (EVO): less combatant but nonetheless important, these soldiers are skilled in the operation of heavy mechanical equipment and engineering vehicles such as heavy bulldozers, excavators, cranes, tractors and mine-breaching devices. EVO units are called צמ"ה (Tzama) in Hebrew, acronym of Tziyud Mechani Handasi (Mechanical Engineering Equipment). Their professional ranks are Rifleman 05 (רובאי 05) and EVO Operator 07 (מפעיל צמ"ה 07).
  - Bulldozer Operators: belong to the EVO, these soldiers operate the IDF Caterpillar D9 armored bulldozers, including under heavy fire. Their roles are versatile and differ according to the units to which they are attached. The D9 operators perform construction, destruction, breaching and EOD missions while assisting tanks, infantry and even special forces during battle.
- NBC Disposal: called "purifiers", they are expert in handling nuclear, biological and chemical threats.
- EOD experts: the EOD are experts in nondestructive detonation of explosives and bomb disposal. Among their equipment are the Barrett M82A1 and remote-control EOD robots with shotguns and mechanical arms. The EOD are the military equivalent of the police's bomb squad. In the IDF, they are a part of the elite Engineering unit Yahalom.
- Demolition experts: they are specially trained in blowing up targets in the most accurate and effective way. They explode targets ranging from cellular phones and doorlocks up to tanks and large buildings. In the IDF, the demolition experts are united in Sayeret Yael of Yahalom (Sayeret is the Hebrew term for a SF elite unit) and therefore gain high infantry training as well.
- Fortification experts: assigned to designing and overseeing the construction of bases, outposts, bridges and fortifications. Construction itself is usually done by the EVOs.
- Counter-Tunnels experts: established in 2003 by Captain Aviv Hakani, these Combat Engineering Corps soldiers are experts in finding smuggling tunnels and weapon caches, and demolishing them. They operated in Rafah during the al-Aqsa Intifada and received recommendation of honor for their activity. After the 2004 APC incident the Rafah tunnel team was united with the Combat Engineering Corps elite unit Yahalom and was renamed Sayeret Samur ("Samur" means "Weasel" in Hebrew).

== Units ==
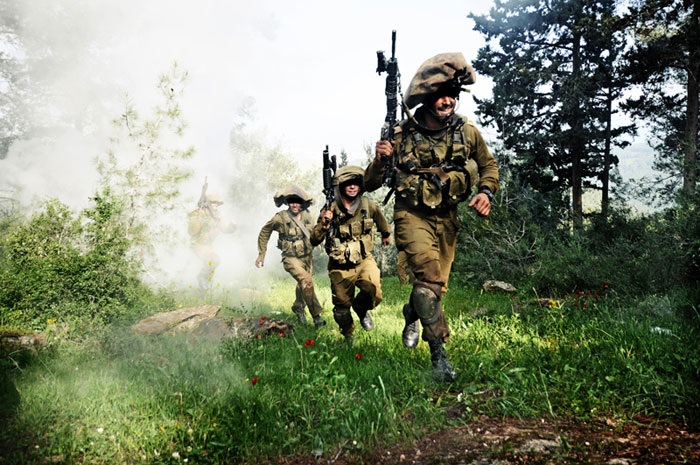
Yahalom operators at the conclusion of a military exercise

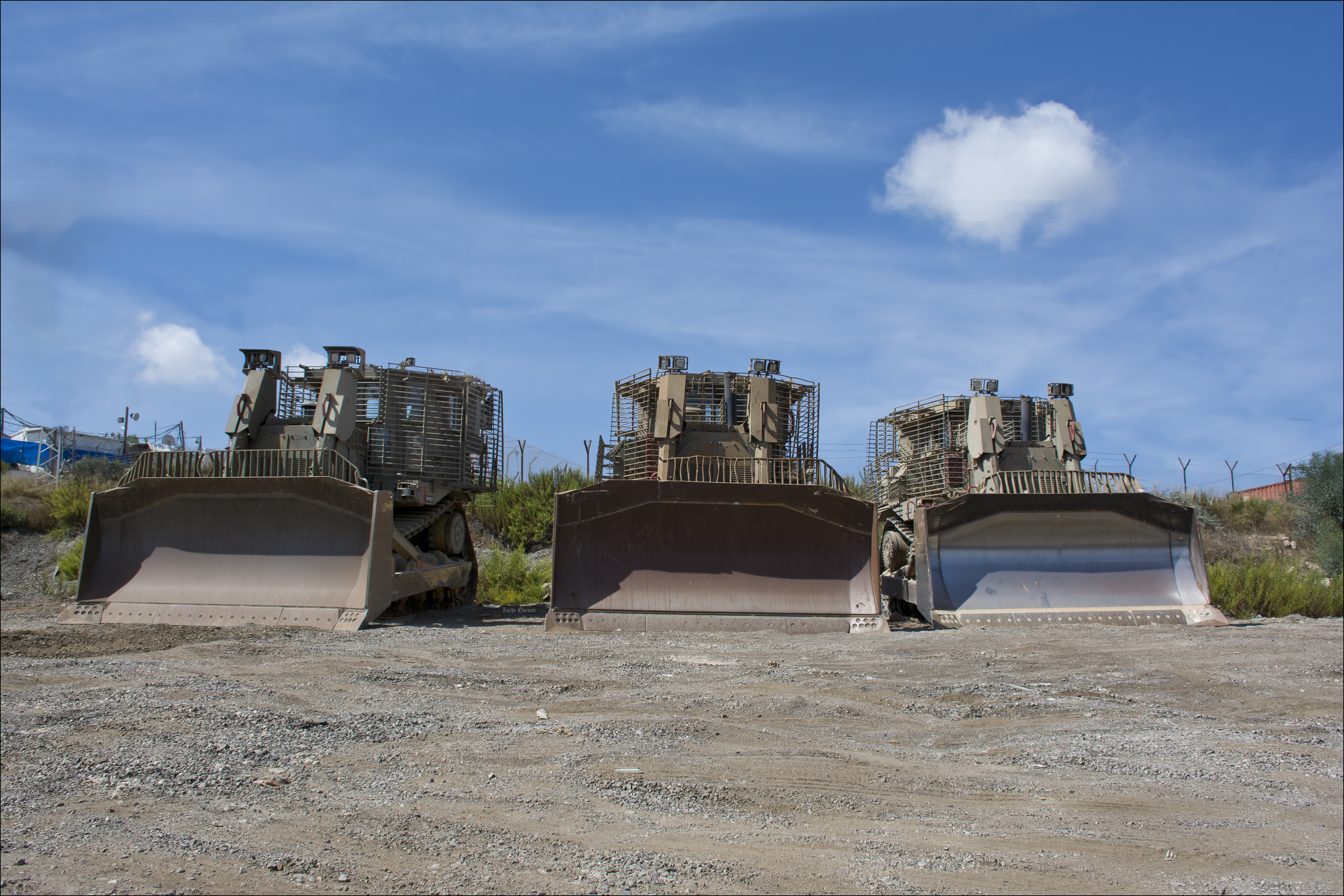
IDF Caterpillar D9 armored bulldozers parking near a military outpost

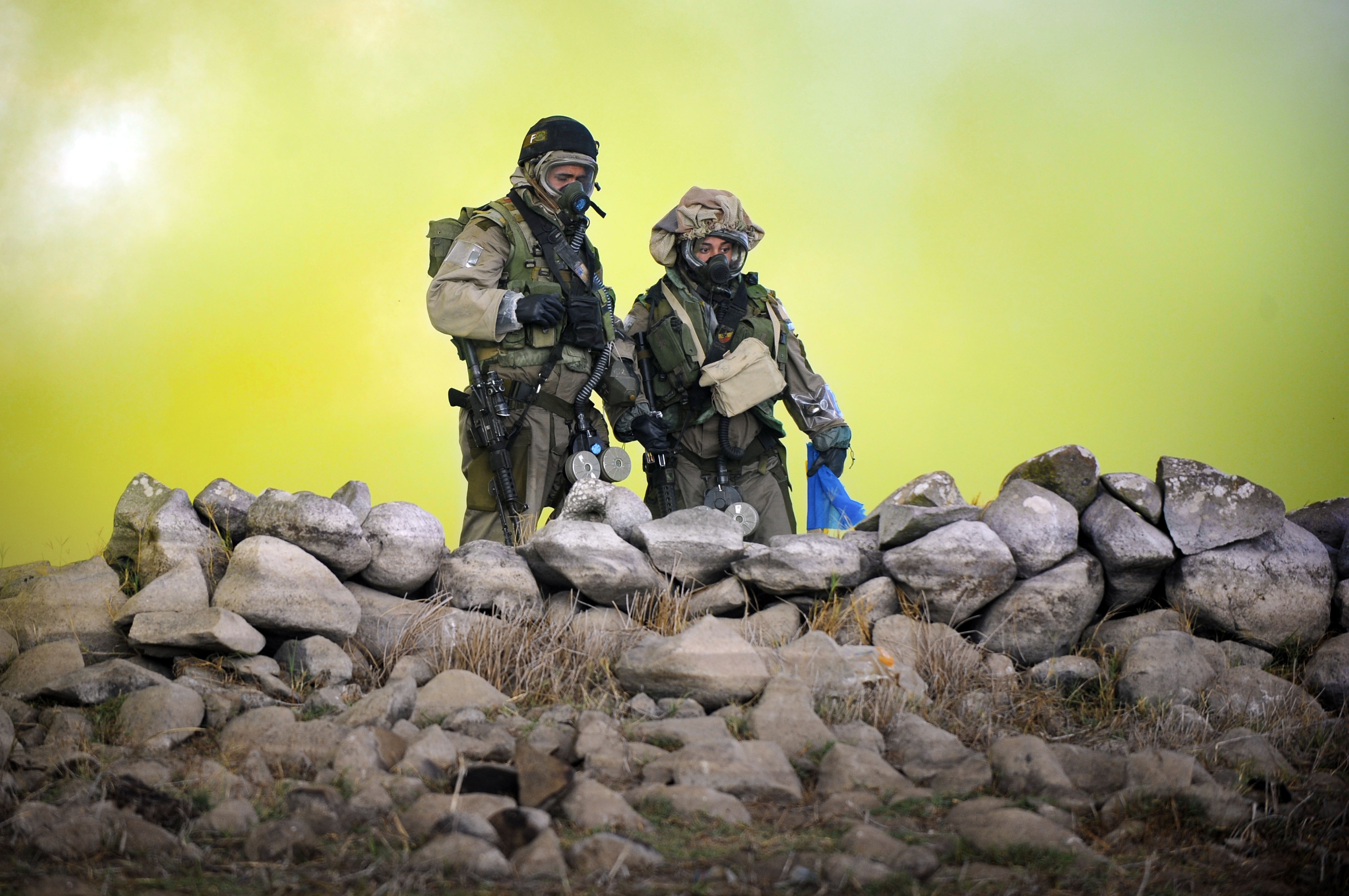
"Yanshuf" (Owl Battalion) troops, specializing in ABC warfare, training on the Golan Heights

=== Active engineering units ===
Assigned to commands, divisions, and brigades:

- Israeli Combat Engineering Corps
  - Northern Command Engineering Unit 801
  - Central Command Engineering Unit 802
  - Southern Command Engineering Unit 803
  - 601st Combat Engineering Battalion "Asaf" (Assigned to the 401st Armored Brigade "I'kvot haBarzel")
  - 603rd Combat Engineering Battalion "Lahav" (Assigned to the 7th Armored Brigade "Saar me-Golan")
  - 605th Combat Engineering Battalion "HaMahatz" (Assigned to the 188th Armored Brigade "Barak")
  - 607th Combat Engineering Battalion "HaMPatz" (Formed 2024 and assigned to the Givati Brigade)
  - 614th Combat Engineering Battalion (Assigned to the 460th Armored Brigade "Bnei Or")
  - Combat Engineering Company "Galilee Cats" (Assigned to the 91st Division)
  - Combat Engineering Company "Steel Cats" (Assigned to the 143rd Division)
  - Combat Engineering Company "Steel Knights" (Assigned to the 143rd Division)
  - Combat Engineering Company "Plateau Cats" (Assigned to the 210th Division)
  - Combat Engineering Company "Wild Cats" (Assigned to the 877th Division)

Assigned to other commands:

- Yahalom – special operations engineering unit
  - Sayeret Yael – commando reconnaissance unit
  - SAP – EOD and bomb disposal unit
  - SAMUR – counter-tunneling unit
  - Hevzek – Robotics unit
- 76th CBRN defense Battalion (Assigned to Home Front Command)
- Military Engineering School (BAHALATZ 14)
- YANSHUF – CBRN defense Training Cente

=== Reserve engineering units ===
- 271st Combat Engineering Battalion (Assigned to the 14th Armored Brigade "Machatz")
- 710th Combat Engineering Battalion (Assigned to the 179th Armored Brigade "Re'em")
- 749th Combat Engineering Battalion (Assigned to the 828th Infantry Brigade)
- 924th Combat Engineering Battalion (Assigned to the 10th Armored Brigade "Harel")
- 5280th Combat Engineering Battalion (Assigned to the 3rd Infantry Brigade "Alexandroni")
- 7071st Combat Engineering Battalion (Assigned to the 4th Armored Brigade "Kiryati")
- 7086th Combat Engineering Battalion "Alon" (Assigned to the 1st Infantry Brigade "Golani")
- 7107th Combat Engineering Battalion "Raz" (Assigned to the 933rd Infantry Brigade "Nahal")
- 8170th Combat Engineering Battalion (Assigned to the 84th Infantry Brigade "Givati")
- 8173rd Combat Engineering Battalion (Assigned to the 6th Infantry Brigade "Etzioni")
- 8219th Combat Engineering Battalion (Assigned to the 551st Paratroopers Brigade "Hetzei HaEsch")
- 9227th Combat Engineering Battalion (Assigned to the 679th Armored Brigade "Yiftach")

== Equipment ==
=== Personal gear ===
The Israeli combat engineers and sappers are combat soldiers and therefore have a personal gear and weapons as infantry soldiers. Their issued rifle is the M-16A1 (short 13/14-inch barrel) and M4 Carbine. Other weapons include hand grenades, M203 grenade launcher, IMI Negev, FN MAG and M2 Browning machineguns and M24 SWS and Barret M82A1 sniper rifles.

=== Vehicles ===
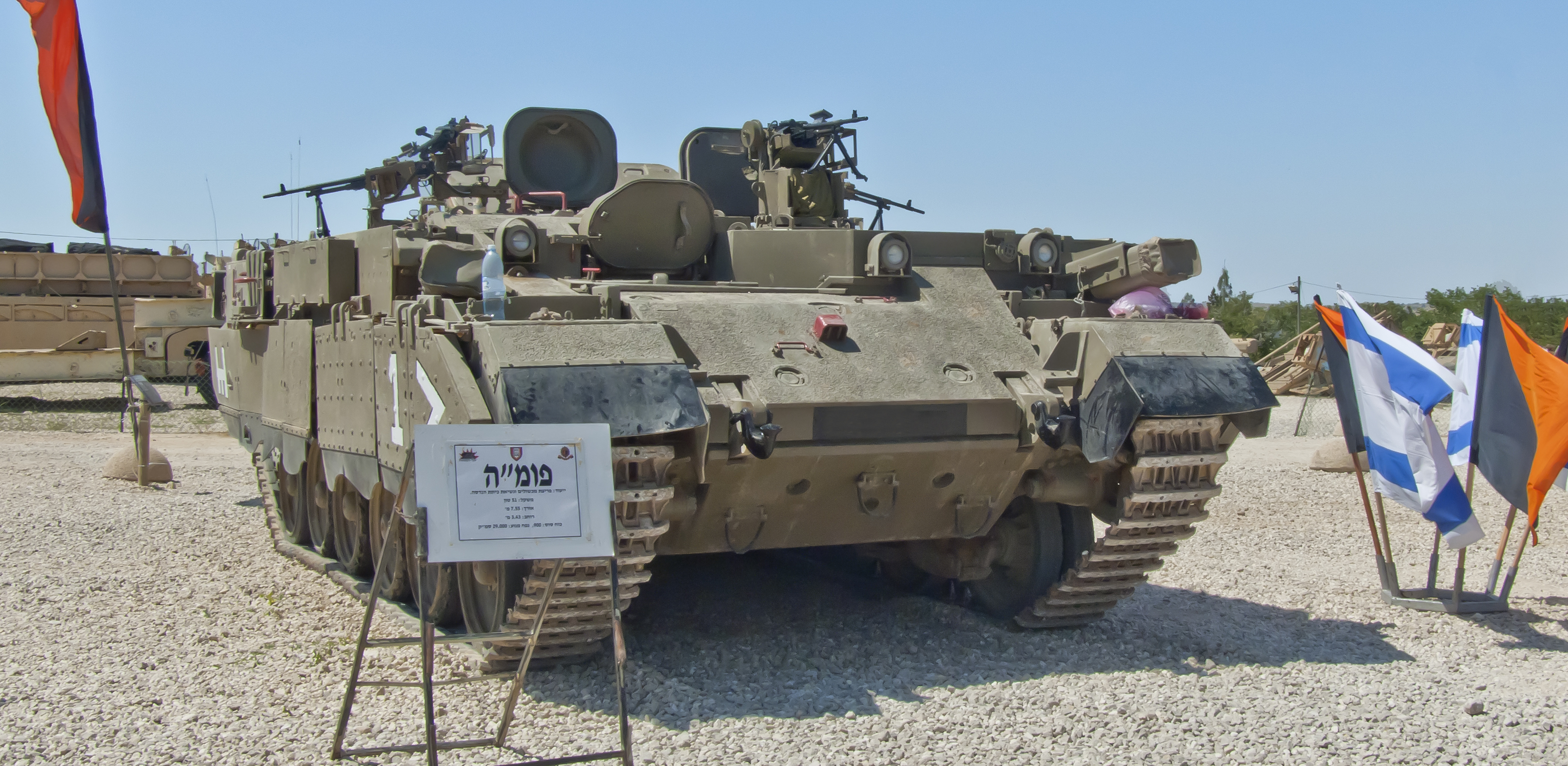
IDF Puma

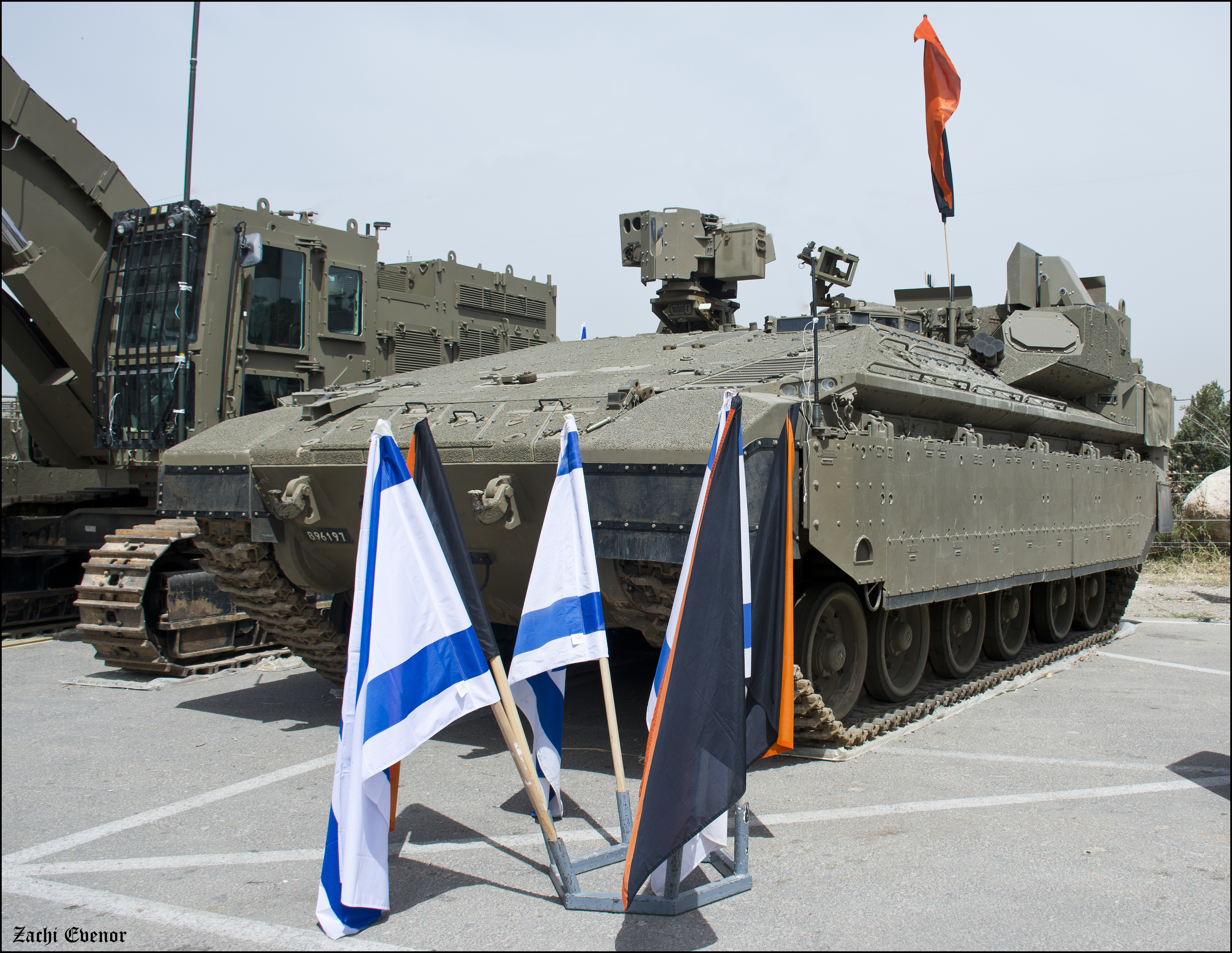
IDF Nammer CEV

The combat engineering soldiers are mobilized by APCs and armored 4×4 vehicles. The Armoured personnel carriers include the Centurion tank-based IDF Puma, a heavy combat engineering vehicle equipped with engineering devices such as mine plows. Reserve forces use the old and versatile M113 APC. In 2016 the 603rd Combat Engineering Battalion ("Lahav") started to receive IDF Namer Combat engineering vehicle based on the Namer APC.

Wheeled armored vehicles include the HMMWV ("Hummer"), Wolf Armoured Vehicle and M240 Sufa.

=== Heavy equipment ===
The Combat Engineering Corps operates heavy equipment and engineering vehicles (called TZAMA in Hebrew) such as armored bulldozers, armored excavators, armored wheeled loaders, armored backhoe loaders and more. The best known tool is the heavily armored IDF Caterpillar D9 bulldozer.

=== Mine breaching devices ===
The Combat Engineering Corps has different means to breach fast through mine fields. These include personal sapper gear, vehicle-mounted mine plows and mine rollers which can be attached to engineering vehicles and tanks, CARPET air-fuel rockets and the "Tzefa Shiryon" (Hebrew for "Armor's Viper") which is extremely powerful and can clear large mine fields.

=== Explosives ===
The Combat Engineering Corps has a wide range of explosives, demolition charges and different land mines.

=== Robots ===
Yahalom SF Unit operates many types of robots, including bomb disposal robots, reconnaissance robots and remote-controlled heavy equipment (such as "Raam HaShachar" D9N bulldozer, and the "Front-Runner" mini-cat loader).

=== NBC ===
Counter-NBC soldiers are equipped with protective suits and gas masks, chemical ID systems and purification vehicles.

=== Gallery ===
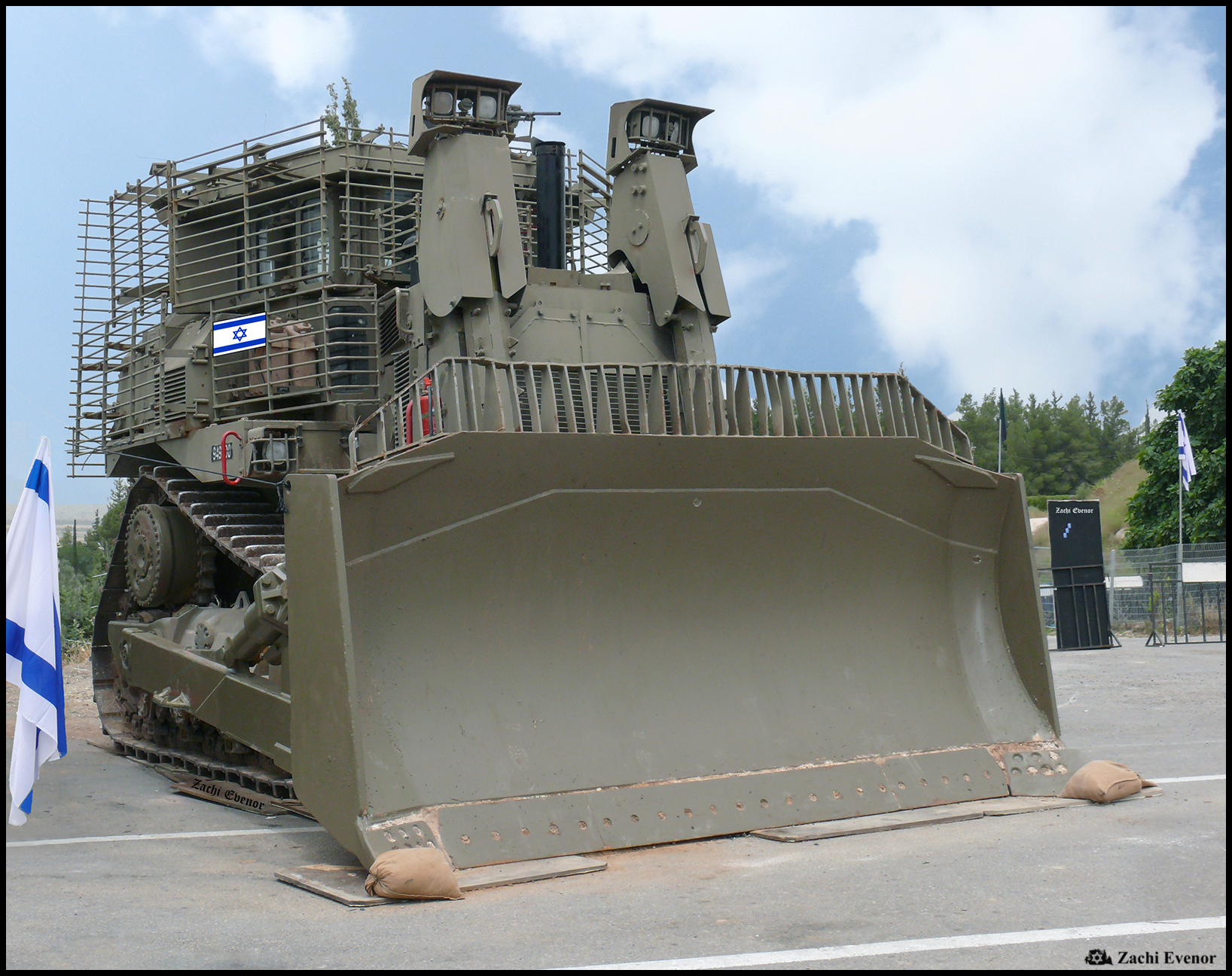
IDF Caterpillar D9.
Armored bulldozers are standard combat engineering tools, as they can perform construction, destruction and EOD missions under heavy fire.

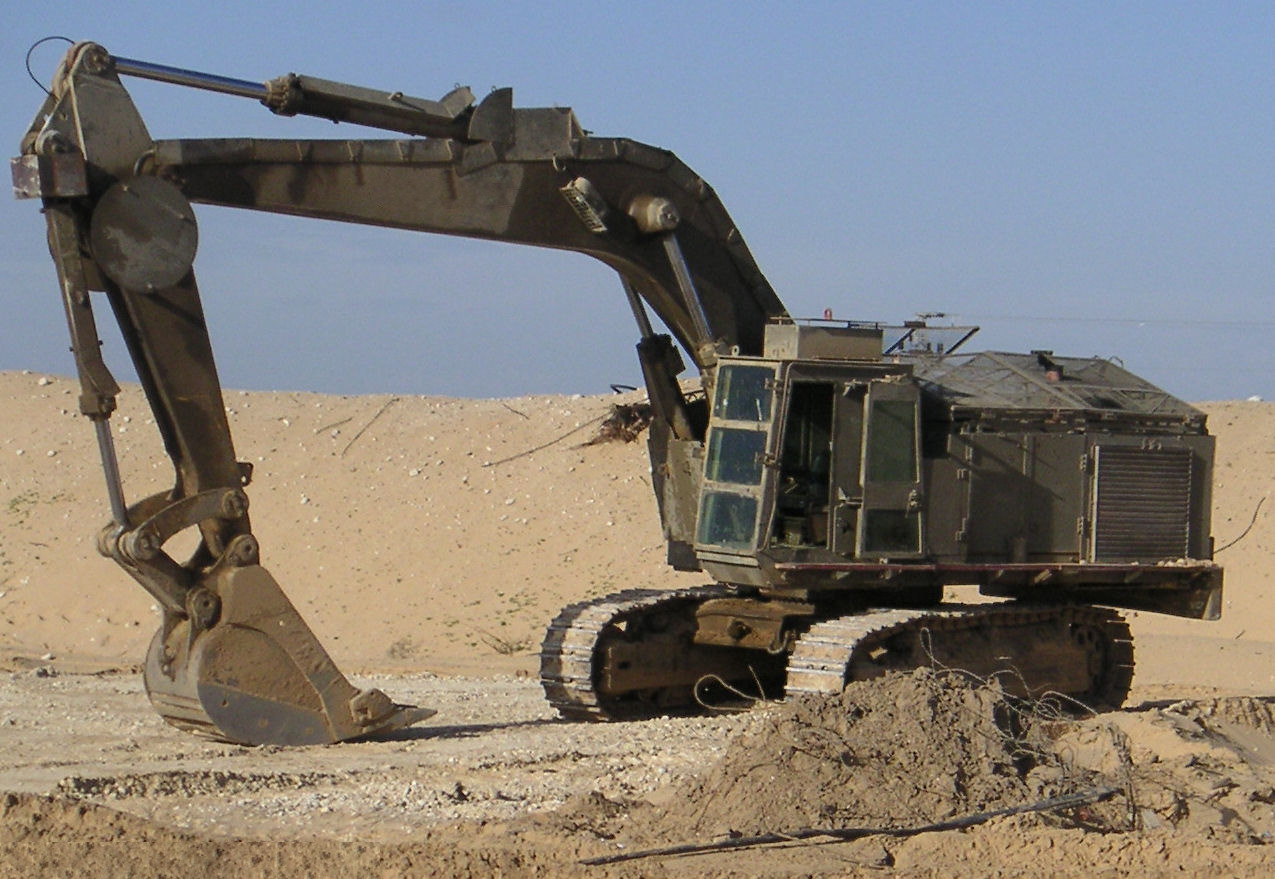
Armored excavator.

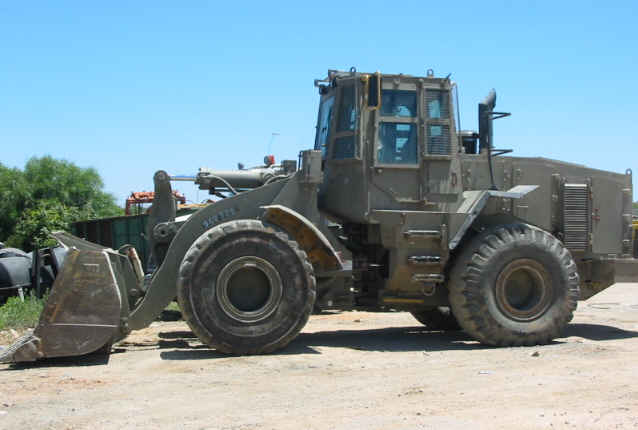
Armored front loader.

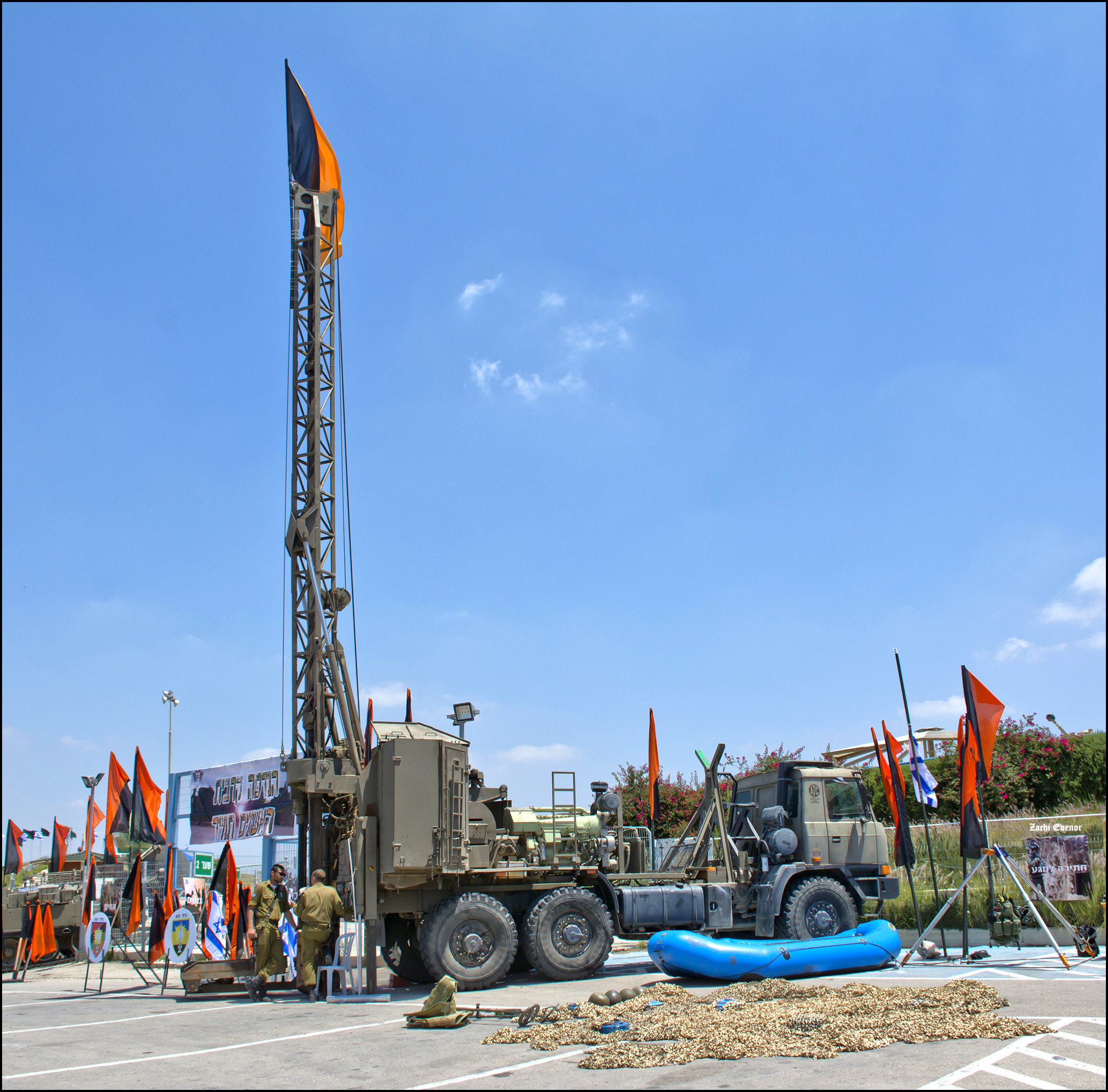
Counter-tunnel driller mounted on a Tatra truck.

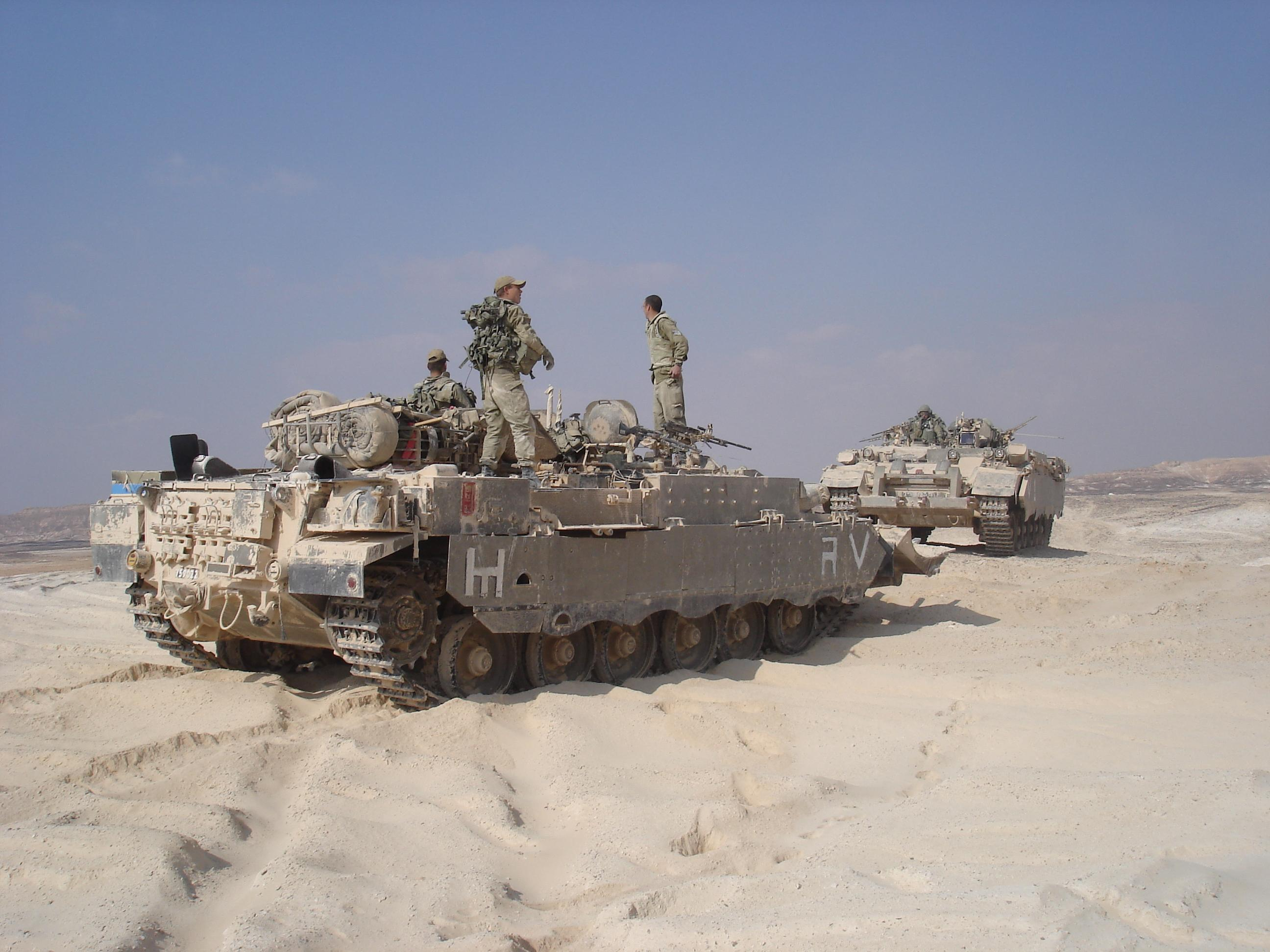
IDF Puma.
Puma is a heavy armed engineering vehicle, used to transfer Combat Engineering Corps through minefields or a hostile urban terrain.

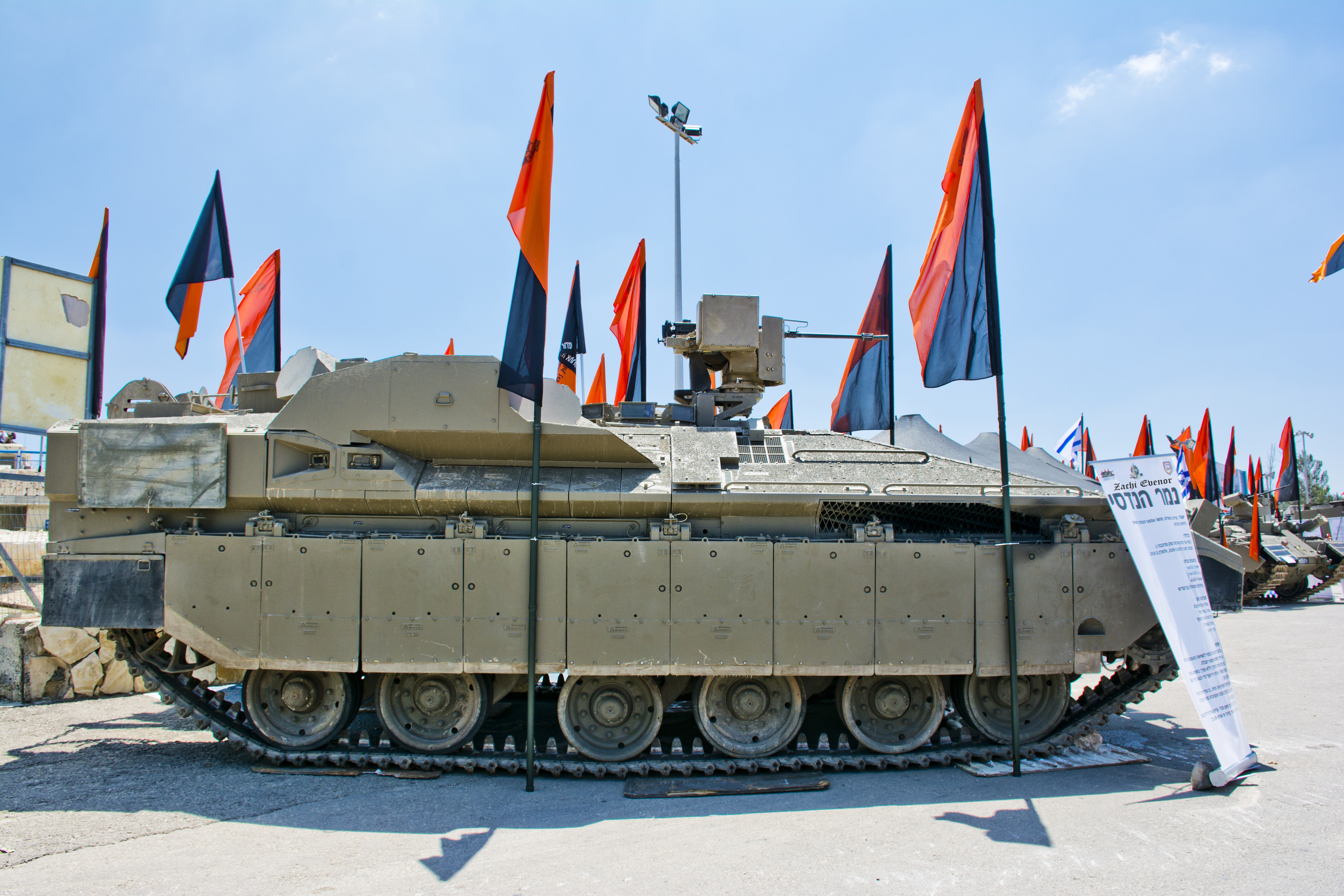
IDF Namer CEV – combat engineering version of the Namer APC

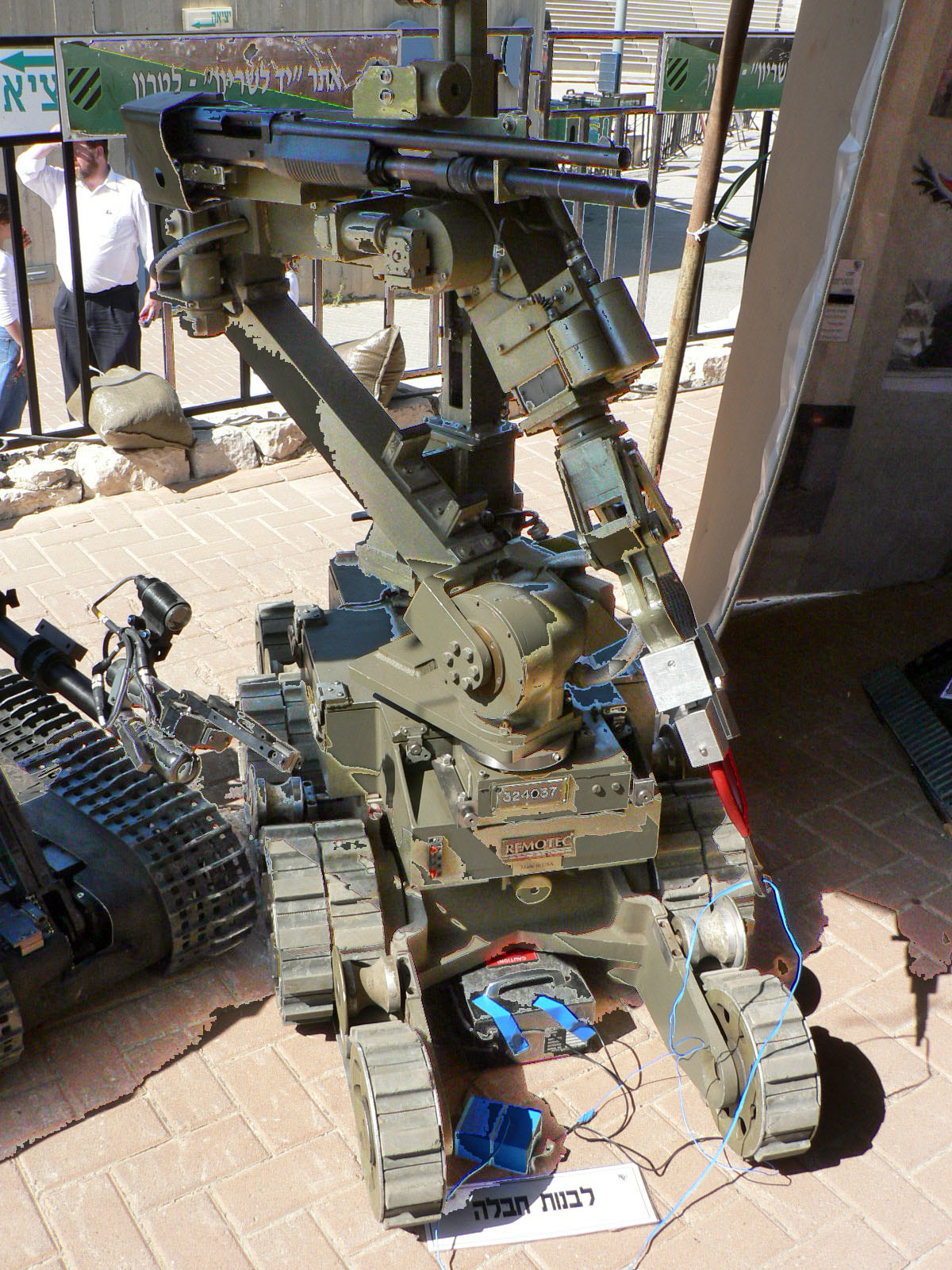
RemoTec ANDROS EOD robot.

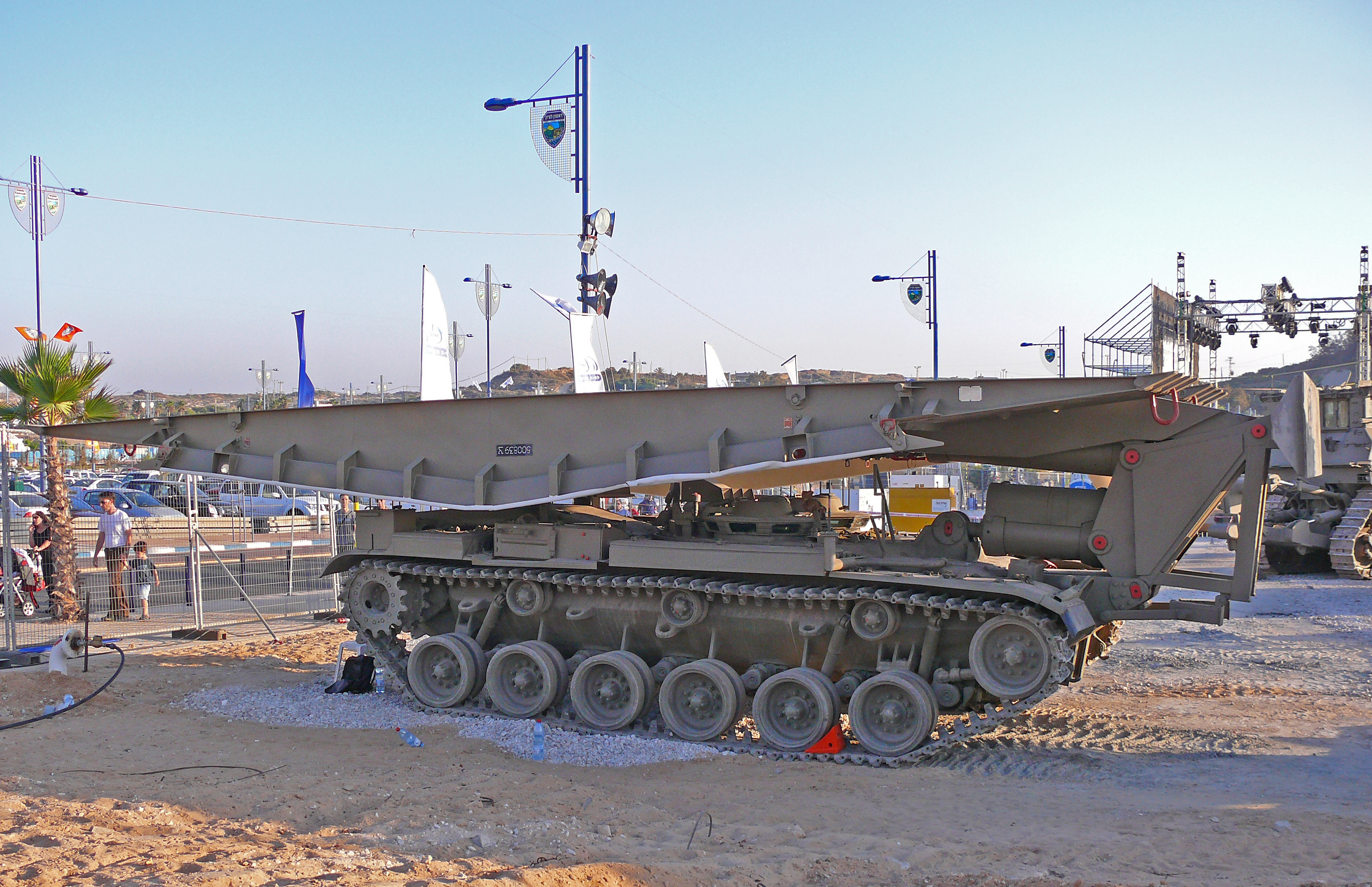
Armoured vehicle-launched bridge.

== History ==
=== Founding ===
The Combat Engineering Corps traces its origins to the Haganah technical department, which was founded in 1934. It was responsible for planning and constructing fortifications for Jewish settlements and neighborhoods, especially Tower and Stockade settlements. During World War II, some Jews from Palestine who enlisted in the British Army served in the Royal Engineers and Auxiliary Military Pioneer Corps. The Haganah's elite strike force, the Palmach, also formed sabotage units. Many of those who would go on to serve in the Combat Engineering Corps gained experience from the British Army and Palmach sabotage units.

The Combat Engineering Corps was formally established in 1947, at the outset of the Israeli War of Independence. A few months after the start of the war, the first engineering school was established.

The Combat Engineering Corps chief engineer, Brigadier General David Laskov (not to be confused with Chief Engineering Officer קצין הנדסה ראשי, the commander of the Combat Engineering Corps), developed many combat engineering systems for the Israel Defense Forces, and won three Israel Security Prizes. He served in the IDF until his death at the age of 86, thus being the oldest soldier in the world.

=== In Israel's wars ===
In the 1948 Palestine war, the Combat Engineering Corps blasted bridges over the Jordan River and the streams of the southern Coastal plain in order to stop the advance of the Arab armored forces into the Israeli rear. The Combat Engineering Corps also helped in breaching the "Burma Road" into besieged Jerusalem and built roads wherever needed. Due to a lack of engineering equipment, much of it was improvised. In addition, combat engineers used whatever equipment was left behind by the British as well as equipment owned by construction companies, contractors, kibbutzim, and private individuals.

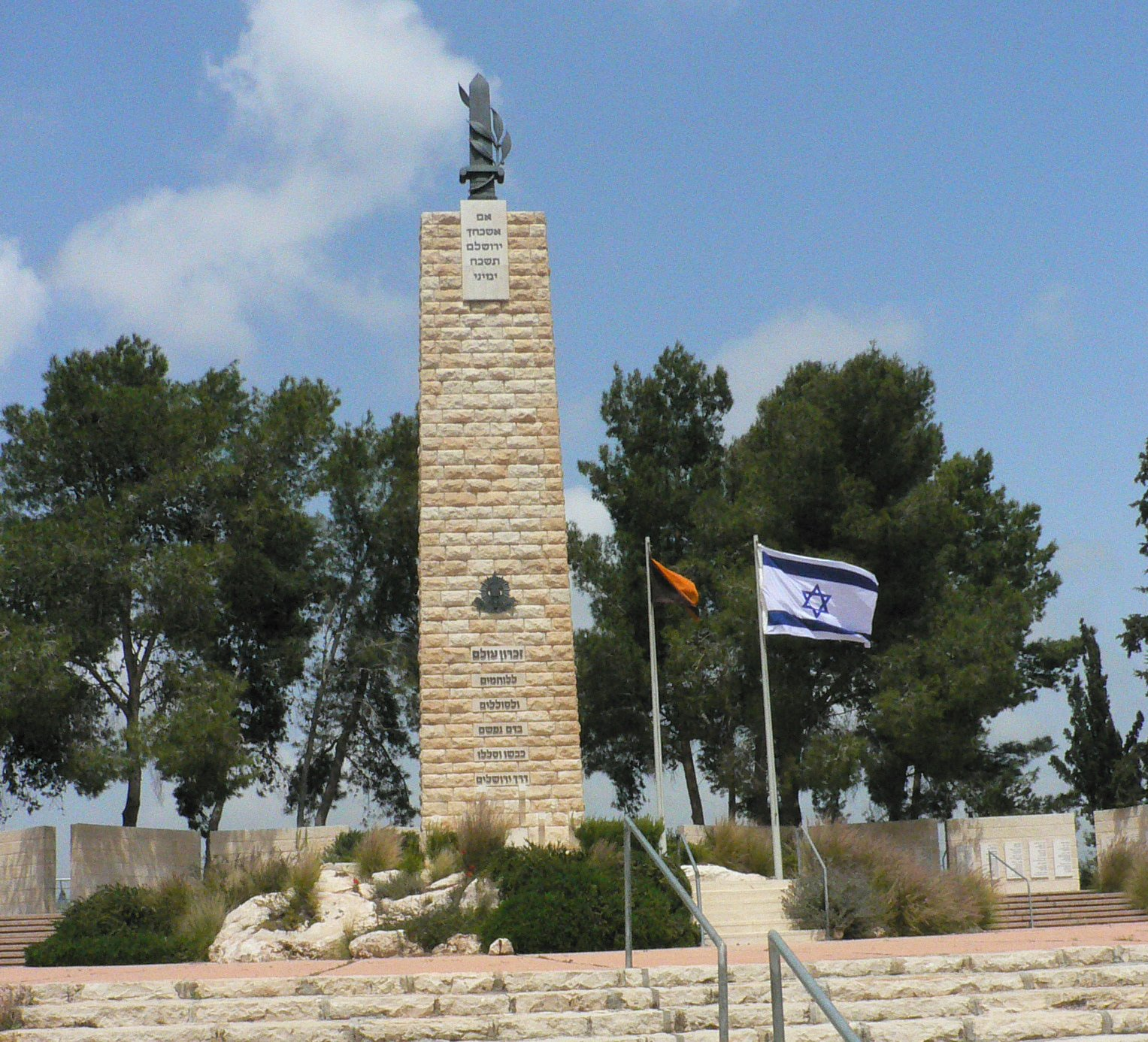
"Road of Heroism" memorial for the fallen soldiers of the Israeli Engineering Corps, near Hulda forest, at the Burma Road, Israel

In the Suez Crisis, the Combat Engineering Corps destroyed Egyptian military infrastructure in the Sinai Peninsula and was awarded with a battalion recommendation of honor.

In the 1967 Six-Day War the Combat Engineering Corps stormed Jordanian fortifications along the walls of the Old City of Jerusalem. After Israel annexed the Old City, the Combat Engineering Corps removed landmines planted in the city by the Jordanians. This was the first war in which Caterpillar D9 bulldozers were employed by the corps.

After the war, the Combat Engineering Corps helped to build a fortification line of defense along the Suez Canal.

In the 1973 Yom Kippur War the combat engineering battalions attached to Ariel Sharon's armored division bridged the Suez Canal during "Operation Knights of Heart", while carrying tanks and paratroopers across the canal with Gillois amphibious tank-carriers. This effort enabled Sharon and Avraham "Bren" Adan's armored divisions to cross the canal and surround the 3rd Egyptian Army, forcing it to surrender. The bridging of the canal is regarded by many as the turning point of the war on the southern front. On the northern front, a Combat Engineering Corps Caterpillar D9 bulldozer was the first ever motorized vehicle to reach the summit of the Hermon.

In Operation Peace for Galilee the Combat Engineering Corps worked intensively to open routes for Israeli forces. Their duties also included the disarming landmines and Improvised explosive devices as well as building fortifications and outposts.

In the 1991 Gulf War, the NBC purifiers of the Combat Engineering Corps were on a "code red" alert for disarming Iraqi Scud missiles, armed with non-conventional warheads.

=== October 2000 Lebanon abduction ===
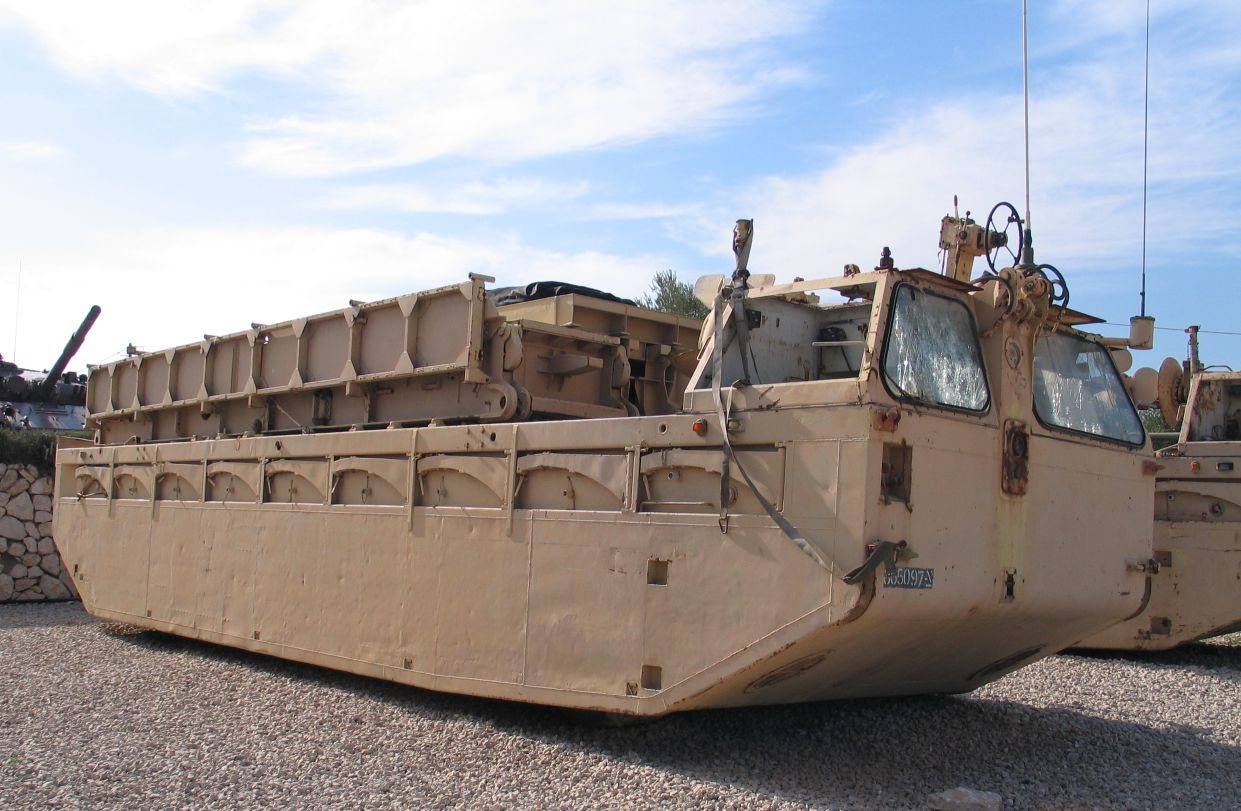
"Timsach" (crocodile) Gillois amphibious tank-carrier

On 7 October 2000 three Israeli combat engineering soldiers were abducted by Hezbollah from the Shebaa Farms, in the Golan Heights. The soldiers, Beni Avraham, Adi Avitan and Omar Sawaed, suffered fatal injuries during their abduction. Their bodies were retrieved in 2004 in a prisoner swap with Hezbollah.

A series of accusations were made against the United Nations Interim Force in Lebanon (UNIFIL) by press and partisan web sites for having cooperated with the abduction. Those accusations stem from a video, whose existence was originally denied by UN officials, recorded by Indian peacekeepers one day after the abduction. The video, which the UN agreed to provide to Israeli officials in June 2001 with civilian faces blurred, showed abandoned vehicles with fake UN license plates and uniforms, and Hezbollah supporters intercepting UN efforts to retrieve the vehicles. A UN investigation found no evidence to support accusations of peacekeepers involvement in the abduction. Although the bereaved families met with Kofi Annan, they refused to accept the UN version. In September 2004, the bereaved families announced their intention to sue the UN, Hezbollah, Iran, Syria and Lebanon for their parts in the abduction.

=== Second Intifada ===
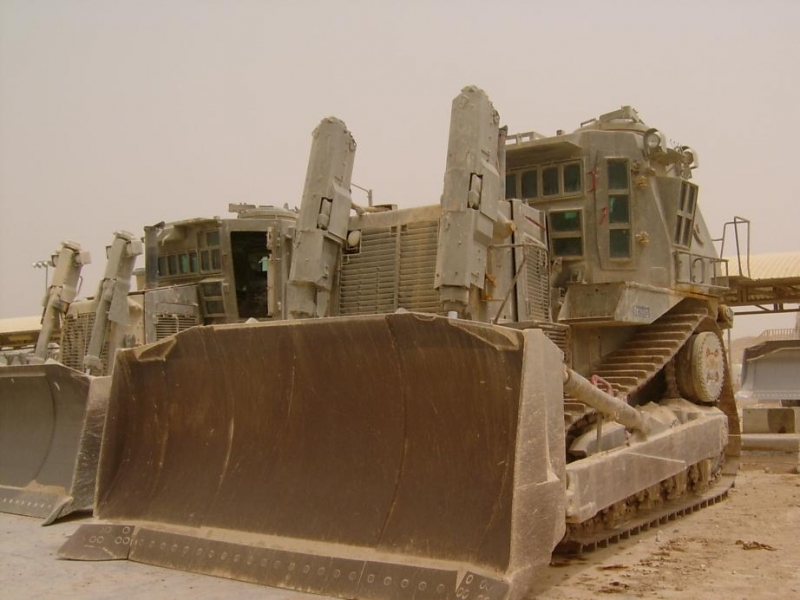
IDF Caterpillar D9, which helped win the Battle of Jenin in 2002, during Operation Defensive Shield. The armored bulldozers were cited by military experts as a key factor in keeping IDF casualties low.

During the Second Intifada, which erupted in September 2000, the Combat Engineering Corps were employed to disarm Palestinian IED explosive charges and booby traps.

Armored bulldozers were also massively employed in Rafah to counter smuggling tunnels. Human Rights Watch published a report criticizing the extensive destruction of Palestinian houses in the southern Gaza Strip, and said it was unlawful, claiming that Israel uses the Palestinian smuggling tunnels as a pretext to create a "buffer zone" along the Gaza-Egypt border.

=== Second Lebanon War ===
The Combat Engineering Corps took significant part in the 2006 Lebanon War that erupted in 2006.

On 16 July combat engineering forces from Asaf battalion were the first to enter Lebanon. Their mission was to clear improvised explosive devices, open safe routes to ground forces and demolish Hizbullah infrastructures. Yahalom bomb disposal experts and IDF Caterpillar D9 bulldozers cleared most of Hizbullah's IEDs. During the war, a D9 went over a 500 kg belly charge improvised explosive devices but survived without taking significant damage.

During the war, combat engineers used bulldozers and explosives to destroy Hezbollah outposts, bunkers, warehouses and HQs—mainly along the border. Combat engineers also rescued damaged tanks, often under enemy fire.

Two combat engineers were awarded with Medal of Distinguished Service and other two awarded a recommendation of honor from the General Chief of Staff. Many other awarded with recommendation of honor from less senior commanders.

=== 2008–2009 Gaza War ===
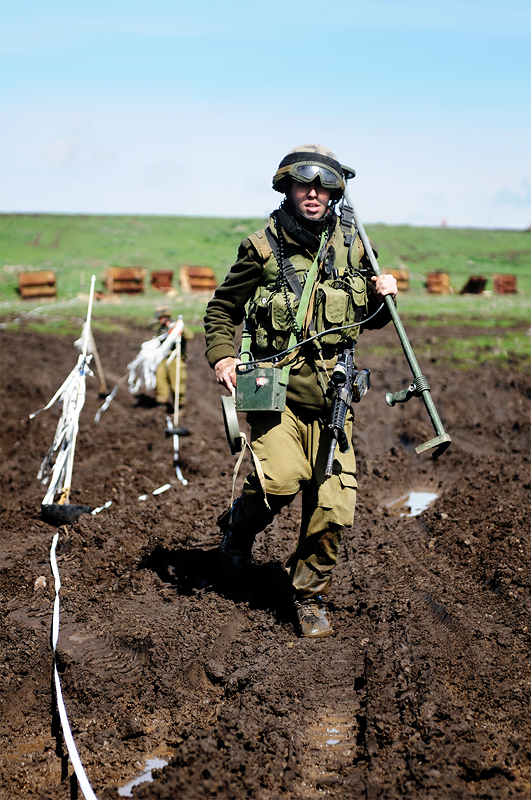
Combat Engineer in training

During the Gaza War (2008–2009) codenamed "Operation Cast Lead" by the IDF, combat engineering forces were the first to enter the Gaza Strip to clear IEDs, booby traps and open safe routes to armor and infantry.

Many booby traps, tunnels, and other defensive measures were prepared in the Gaza Strip by Hamas, but most of the Palestinian booby traps were successfully neutralized by the IDF Combat Engineering Corps bomb disposal experts (part of Yahalom Special Engineering Unit) and armored D9 bulldozers. IDF Caterpillar D9R and unmanned "Raam HaShachar" D9N armored bulldozers which opened route in dangerous areas took many hits from IEDs, landmines, explosive charges and RPGs, but no crewmen were killed. However, a Yahalom bomb disposal expert was killed after entering a house and encountering a suicide bomber. He was the only fatality of the Combat Engineering Corps during the war.

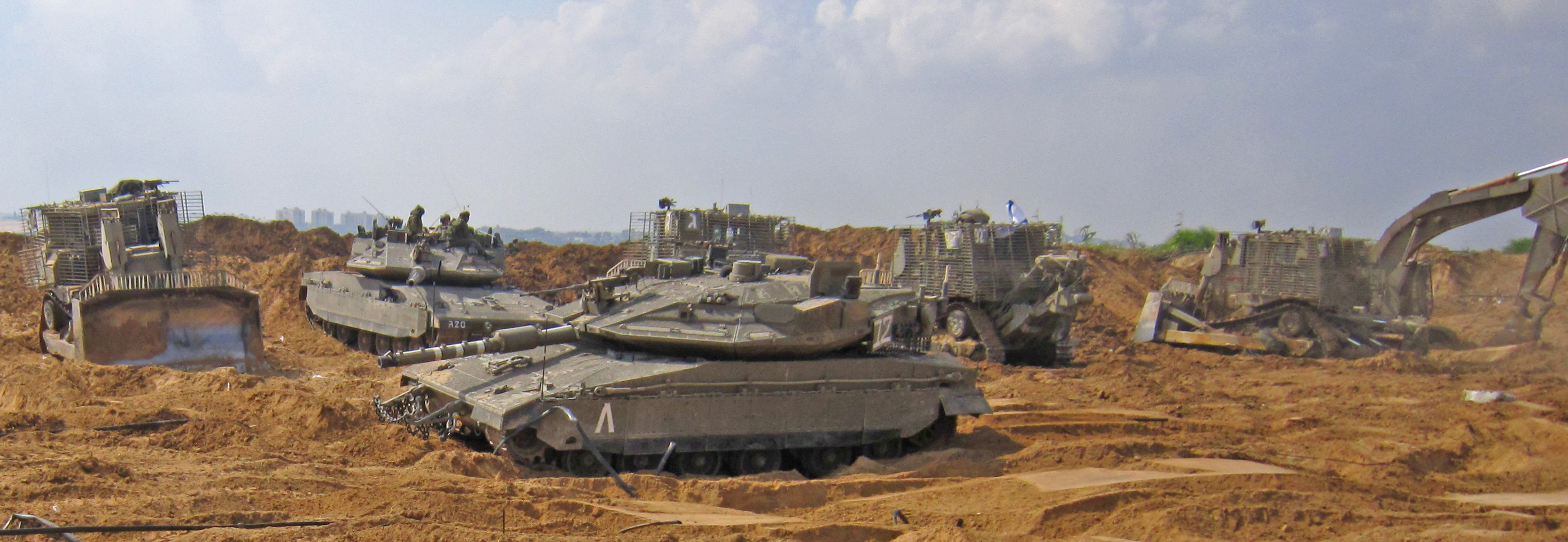
Armored IDF Caterpillar D9 bulldozers and armored Bagger E-349 excavator, parked during the 2014 Gaza War.

Besides neutralizing Hamas IEDs and traps, combat engineering forces demolished buildings and other structures that could be used as cover. The head officer of the Combat Engineering Corps (קהנ"ר) estimated that about 600 buildings were bulldozed or exploded by his troops.

The Combat Engineering Corps' success heightened their reputation within the IDF and in the Israeli public. This was manifested in increased number of conscripts who chose the Combat Engineering Corps as their first priority in their draft preferation questionnaire ("Manila מנילה"—a form in which the conscript chooses in what unit he would like to serve, the IDF tries to fulfill his request as much as possible).

=== 2014 Gaza War ===
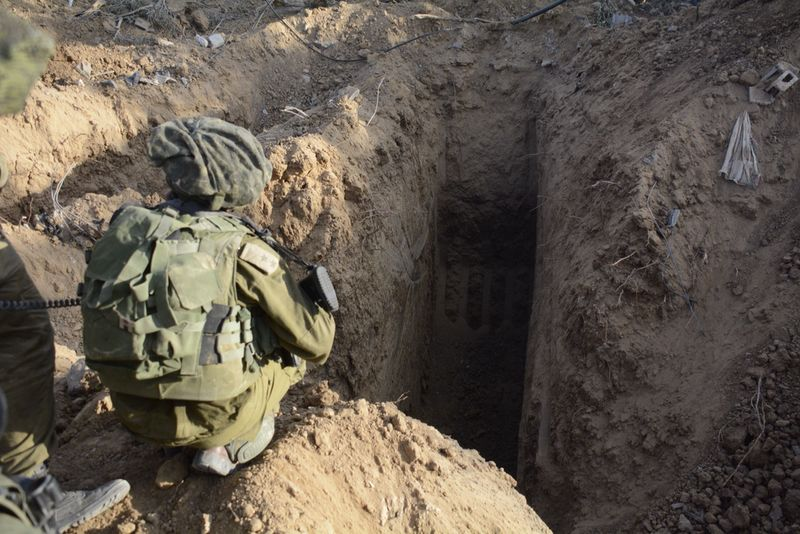
Combat engineer looking at a Hamas infiltration tunnel exposed by the IDF during Operation Protective Edge.

During the 2014 Gaza War (July–August 2014) Combat Engineers played a major role in destroying underground tunnels. The tunnels were exposed and cleared by armored bulldozers and excavators, and then detonated by Yahalom's Samoor unit. In total, about 32 tunnels were destroyed. In addition, combat engineers participated in the battles, neutralized Hamas-planted improvised explosive devices, cleared booby-traps, opened routes for armor and infantry, and destroyed Gaza infrastructure. Six combat engineers were killed during the battles in the Gaza Strip.

=== Operation Northern Shield ===
In late 2018, the IDF commenced Operation Northern Shield to detect, located and destroy Hezbollah tunnels dug into northern Israel from South Lebanon. The combat engineering corps played the major role in the operation, operating on ground and below it, deploying Yahalom tunnel warfare teams and heavy equipment. As of 12 January 2019, the IDF discovered 6 tunnels.

=== Gaza war ===
During the Gaza war, combat engineers were responsible for locating and destroying enemy tunnels, neutralizing booby traps, and creating access routes for troops in Gaza. They also helped repair the breaches in the Gaza border fence created during the October 7 attacks and clear the aftermath of the attacks. Combat engineers dismantled enemy infrastructure including tunnels in Lebanon during the 2024 Israeli invasion of Lebanon and 2026 Lebanon war.
