= Yahalom (IDF) =

Special combat engineering unit of the Israel Defense Forces

Special Operations Engineering Unit
- יחידה הנדסית למשימות מיוחדות
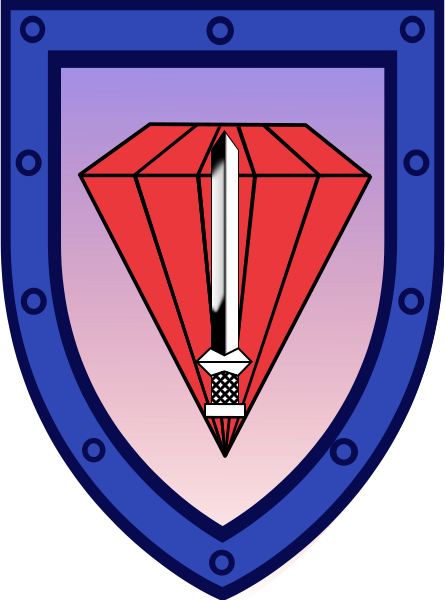
- Combat Engineering Unit for Special Operations - Yahalom
- Active: 1995 - present
- Country: Israel
- Allegiance: Israel Defense Forces
- Branch: Israeli Ground Forces
- Type: Sayeret
- Size: Classified
- Part of: Israeli Combat Engineering Corps
- Garrison/HQ: Camp Emmanuel
- Colors: Silver

Yahalom (Hebrew: יהל"ם, meaning Diamond; also a backronym of יחידה הנדסית למשימות מיוחדות, Special Operations Engineering Unit) is a sayeret (special operations forces) unit of the Israeli Combat Engineering Corps of the Israel Defense Forces (IDF).

== Organization and activities ==
=== Role ===
Yahalom specializes in special engineering missions that include:

- Accurate demolition through pinpoint planting of explosives
- CBRNE consequence management
- Searching, extracting, and destroying CBRN weapons and explosives
- Tactical emergency medical service and medevac when injured by CBRN weapons, and after incidents associated with defusing and disposing of bombs or high-yield explosives
- Commando-style stealth operations
- Counterinsurgency and counterterrorism (CT)
- Military special operations against guerrilla warfare
- Defusing and disposal of bombs, land mines, and unexploded ordnance¹
- Developing advanced methods and tools for demolition and EOD
- Teaching and training engineering corps soldiers and other special units in demolition and EOD
- Maritime sabotage and obstacle breaching
- Route reconnaissance and clearing routes of IEDs
- Searching and destroying smuggling tunnels

=== General activities ===
Yahalom is a classified unit and almost none of its special activities are exposed to the public. Public accounts of its activities usually just credit a "combat engineering force"; a term that can equally describe regular Engineering sappers, IDF Caterpillar D9 operators and infantry engineering companies. Jane's Defence Weekly has claimed that Yahalom are working closely with Sayeret Matkal and Shayetet 13, by providing them with demolition, explosive and sabotage skills. Most of the equipment that Yahalom has developed for its missions is classified. Yahalom maintains secrecy to make it more difficult for enemies to develop countermeasures.

=== Sub-units ===
- Yael ("Ibex") - a commando demolition unit that conducts long range sabotage, combat engineering, counter terror, and maritime engineering missions. The YAEL team has destroyed weapon caches hidden in military and civilian infrastructure, tunnels used to smuggle weapons, and firing positions.
- SAP ("EOD Unit") - an EOD unit that removes land mines and missile warheads, handles nuclear, biological and chemical (NBC) threats, performs bomb disposal, and accompanies special operations units on missions where their units are at risk of encountering explosive booby traps. YACHSAP is constantly engaged in defusing large IEDs that Hezbollah has set along the Israel-Lebanon border and bombs Palestinians have planted in the West Bank and the Gaza Strip. They often use armored bulldozers when executing those missions. SAP is initials for Bomb disposal.
- Samur ("Weasel") - a commando unit whose expertise is finding and destroying and if needed fighting in smuggling tunnels and hidden weapon caches. The unit dates back to 2004 when the IDF merged the Southern Command Philadelphi Route Smuggling tunnel experts team into Yahalom to form the Samur platoon.. Samur is also initials for Slikim (Caches) and Minharot (Caves or Tunnels)
- Midron Mushlag ("Snowy Slope") - a unit whose expertise is penetrating buildings using hot breaching techniques using explosives charges, or cold breaching techniques using hydraulic expanders, crow bars and lock picks.
- Hevzek ("Flash") - a unit that operated military robots - defunct.
- SAPIR ("Sapphire") - Aerial ordnance EOD Unit, stationed at major IAF bases and tasked with removal of air ordnance such as bombs, missiles, rockets, etc. It is also tasked with safe removal of unexploded enemy ordnance inside the base perimeter. SAPIR is initials for SAP (Bomb disposal) and Avir (air.)
- Sayfan ("Avocet") - CBRNE unit, trained to respond to threats from weapons of mass destruction, mostly focused on chemical weaponry.
- Givol ("Flower stem") - CBRN disposal unit, composed of reserve service personnel.

=== Arms and equipment ===
- Firearms include the M4 Carbine, handguns, IWI Negev Commando SAW, sniper rifles and combat shotguns.
- Yahalom operates remote-controlled robots inserted into tunnels, obviating the need for human operators to risk their lives. EOD robots for handling improvised explosive devices (IEDs), bombs and explosive charges, and advanced EOD vehicles are standard equipment for all engineering units handling explosives. The Israel Border Police bomb disposal experts use similar equipment. Yahalom also uses the up-armored IDF Caterpillar D9 bulldozer and the remote-controlled Raam HaShachar ("Morning thunder") version of the D9 (which were found extremely useful for special operation and CT duties), an armored excavator with drills, the IDF Puma combat engineering vehicle (CEV), and Nakpuma, a Nakpadon APC modified to Yahalom's requirements.

== Recruitment and training ==
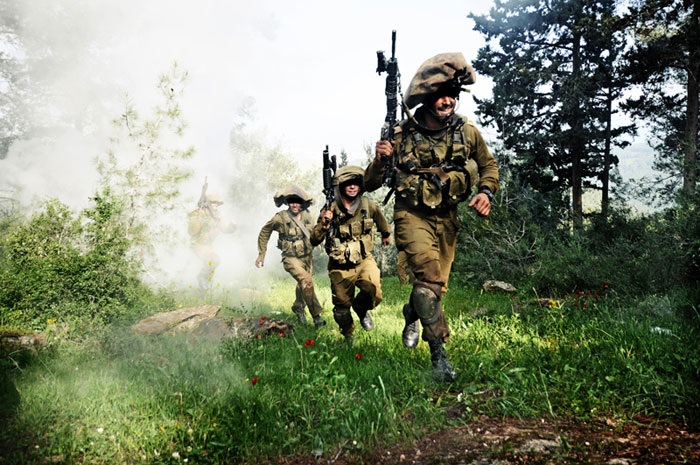
Soldiers from Yahalom at the end of a concluding military exercise.

In order to be accepted into the unit one must enlist with the Israeli Engineering Corps and go through basic training ("Tironut"), where commanders identify the best trainees and select them for "Gibbush" (a grueling five-day test of physical and mental condition in intensive field trials). The best graduates of Gibbush are invited to join the unit and receive advance training, which takes another year. Because the training takes a total of 1.4 years, the volunteers must agree to serve an extra year (in addition to the mandatory three year service in the IDF). The training includes training in engineering, explosive ordnance disposal, advanced combat and counter-terrorism.
