= Mole Men =

The term mole men is commonly used to refer to mole people, real or fictional members of a subterranean society.

Mole Men or Mole People may also refer to:

== Fictional characters ==
- Mole Man, a super villain from Marvel comic books
- Hans Moleman, a character in The Simpsons
- Mole People, (or Moloids) of Subterranea, a fictional race of underground-dwellers in Marvel comic books
- Mole Men, a race of tall hairy beings from the comedy-action TV series Saul of the Mole Men
- Mole Men, a race of burrowing humanoids in Wonder Woman #4 (1943)

== Books ==
- The Mole People: Life In The Tunnels Beneath New York City

== Films ==
- Superman and the Mole Men a 1951 film
- The Mole People, (1956) horror film
- Mole Men Against the Son of Hercules a 1961 sword and sandal film
- Mole Man (2017) a documentary on hobby tunneler Ron Heist

== Music ==
- Molemen (producers), a trio of Hip Hop producers from Chicago, Illinois

== Nicknames ==
- Engineer William Lyttle (1931-2010), nicknamed "The Mole Man of Hackney" by local press
