= Hobby tunneling =

Form of recreation involving constructive excavation

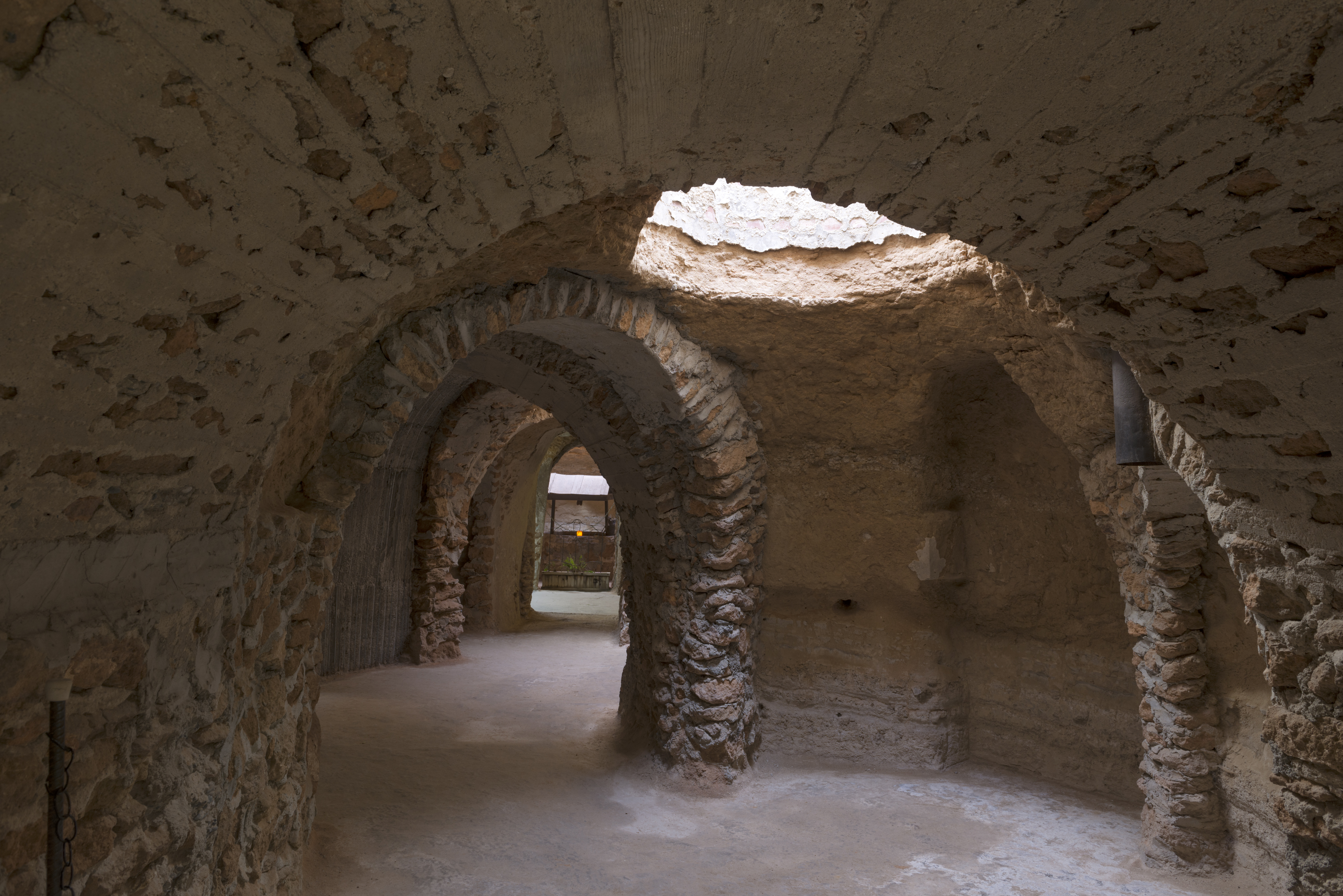
Hobby tunnels in the Forestiere Underground Gardens

Hobby tunneling is tunnel construction as a pastime. Usually, hobby tunnelers dig their tunnels by hand, using little equipment, and some can spend years or even decades to achieve any degree of completion. In some cases tunnels have been dug secretly, and are only discovered by chance.

== Motivations ==
A tunnel is an underground passageway, dug through the surrounding soil or rock for the purpose of transport, passage or communication. Tunnel construction is a sub-discipline of civil engineering and usually the domain of engineers and construction companies. When civilians dig tunnels, it may be for criminal purposes (like smuggling or hiding illegal goods), or gaining unauthorised access to an area.

Tunneling may be part of the building of underground dwellings. Subterranean construction may be done as an art form, as in the work of Ra Paulette. Dutch graphic designer Leanne Wijnsma digs short, shallow tunnels as an art form and for fun. She has dug thirteen by 2015, three at cultural festivals.

=== Hobby ===
A few people have dug tunnels as a hobby or for fun, although some have given additional reasons for their activities. Seymour Cray, for instance, said that the work of digging helped him to think about other problems, and Harrison Dyar saw digging as a form of exercise.

Some hobbyists started out constructing something useful, but continued digging after completion. This was the case with William Lyttle, who started by digging a wine cellar, and Michael Altmann, who excavated a cooling cellar for a café. A Swiss contemporary of Altmann named Peter Junker dug in his garden, searching for water, but continued digging after finding some, excavating a tunnel length of 220 metres (720 ft).

Others maintain that they excavated for a particular purpose, although their tunnelling effort seems out of proportion to the stated purpose. Dyar biographer Marc Epstein thinks it is mainly outsiders that desire a sense of purpose. On Dyar's tunneling for exercise reasons he says that "it’s almost unfathomable, the amount of energy it would take" and that "it still doesn’t add up".

Author Will Hunt thinks extensive tunnelling is at least part obsession. Psychiatrist Anton Tölk believes that tunnel digging can be interpreted as a desire to return to the security of the mother's womb, and that as an activity it allows contemplative satisfaction.

== Notable cases ==
=== Michael Altmann ===
Between 1958 and 2008, Austrian Michael Altmann dug two tunnels of 180 metres (590 ft) combined. At first, he wanted a cooling cellar for a cafe he was to open, but upon completion he could not get a permit. In 1965, he took over another bar, but kept his digging as a hobby. Altmann would mainly use a pickaxe for digging and occasionally explosives, after passing an explosives handling examination at the fire department. He dug a second tunnel branching off from the first one, using a tunnel drilling machine he designed and built himself. In 1962, he installed steel doors on the tunnel system and added a store of emergency rations, with the intention of making it usable as a nuclear bunker.

In 2008, Altmann reached a block of granite and, considering his age, gave up tunnel digging.

=== Lyova Arakelyan ===
Lyova (or Levon) Arakelyan dug a storage cellar under his house on the edge of Yerevan in 1985. When completed, he continued to dig and kept at it for some 23 years, constructing an extensive complex of tunnels, rooms and stairs which extended 21 metres (69 ft) deep into solid rock. Arakelyan stated that he received directions for his work in dreams and visions. The underground spaces were transformed into a museum, called 'Divine Underground', after his death in 2008. Arakelyan never made any money from his tunneling in life, and the museum provides some income for his family.

=== John Bentinck, 5th Duke of Portland ===
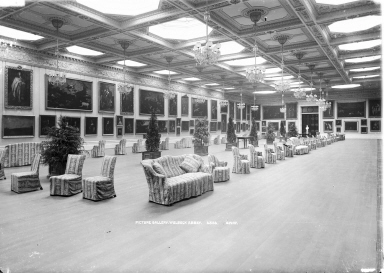
Bentinck's below ground ballroom, later picture gallery

The 5th Duke of Portland is known to have been a hobby tunneler, although he did no digging himself that we know of but rather had workmen build his tunnels. An extensive network of underground spaces was constructed at his Welbeck Abbey estate in the 19th century, with a total length of around 24 kilometres (15 mi). It included hallways, a ballroom, a billiards room, a library and a 900 metres (3,000 ft) tunnel from the mansion to the riding house, wide enough for several people to walk in side by side. Some of the spaces were lit by lightwells and at night by gas lighting. Most of the spaces that are known as 'underground' are, more correctly, 'below ground', constructed in a cut-and-cover technique.

Few of the tunnels and rooms were ever used for their intended purpose. Towards the end of his life, the Duke lived as a recluse and very few people got to see him. Spaces that were intended for social gatherings, such as the ballroom, were never used. But the Duke did frequently use the tunnels that allowed him to move about his property mostly unseen.

=== Seymour Cray ===
The American engineer and supercomputer architect Seymour Cray is known to have been a hobby tunneller. Cray built an 8 by 4 feet (2.4 by 1.2 m) cedar-floored tunnel under his house, explaining that the digging helped him to think about computer designs: "While I'm digging in the tunnel, the elves will often come to me with solutions to my problem."

=== Harrison Dyar ===
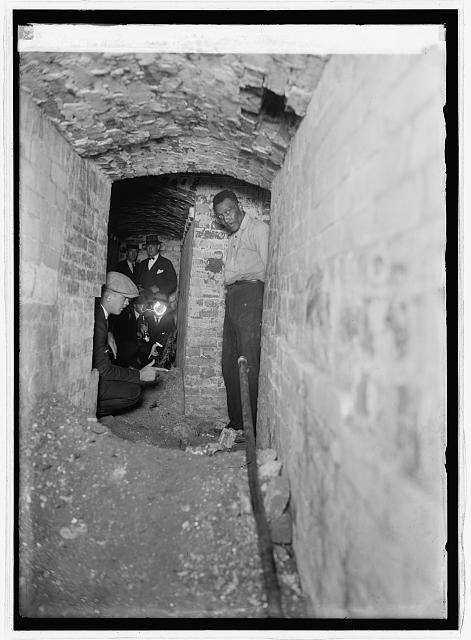
Exploration of Dyar's accidentally discovered first tunnel

The American entomologist Harrison Gray Dyar Jr. constructed a network of tunnels on two occasions, with a length of 400 metres (1,300 ft) combined. His first, under his Washington, D.C. home was accidentally discovered during construction work in 1917, without drawing much attention. It was rediscovered in 1924, when a truck sank through the pavement nearby. The tunnel system led to speculation in the press, not in the least because many German newspapers from the war years of 1917 and 1918 were found in the tunnels. After a few days Dyar came forward as the tunnels' constructor, claiming he had dug them between 1906 and 1916, when he relocated to California.

Back in Washington a few years later, Dyar dug out a second set of tunnels under his new home. The network had concrete lined walls, steel staircases and electric lighting. Dyar described hobby tunneling as a kind of exercise for him, saying "some men play golf, I dig tunnels".

=== Baldassare Forestiere ===
In 1904, Sicilian immigrant Baldassare Forestiere bought a 32-acre (13 ha) plot of land in Fresno for horticulture. The hardpan soil however, was unsuited for the fruit trees he intended to plant. While working elsewhere, Forestiere dug a maze of underground and below ground spaces to escape the summer heat of the San Joaquin Valley. He opened up ceilings to let in light and below he planted the fruit trees he wanted in the first place. The complex consists of bedrooms, living spaces, patios, a fish pond and hallways. After his death in 1946, some of the land was sold off and some tunnels filled in, but currently about 8 acres (3.2 ha) have been saved. It is known as the Forestiere Underground Gardens and has a listing in the National Register of Historic Places.

=== Glen Havens ===
Glen Havens of San Diego, US constructed a maze of tunnels and caverns under his house. Havens started out in 1949, enlarging his barbecue pit, but ended up digging roughly 200 metres (660 ft) of tunnels and underground rooms. Havens enlisted the help of his son and other children in the neighbourhood, who earned pocket money in the process. The underground complex was large enough to hold his daughter's wedding reception in 1960, with some 200 guests attending. Havens ignored building regulations and never got any permit. Local authorities recommended that people not to go inside, but took no further action. A local restaurant is named the "Haven Pizzeria" in Havens' honor.

=== William Lyttle ===
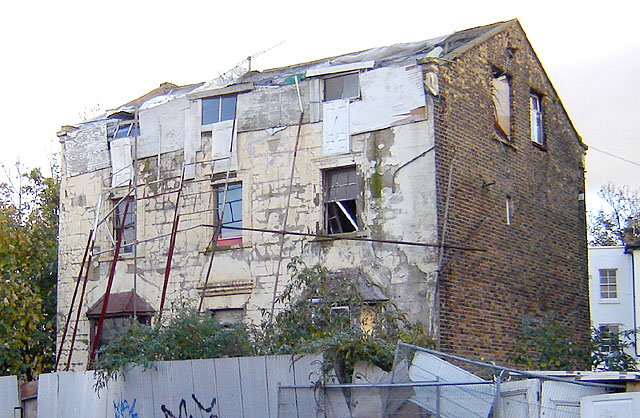
William Lyttle's house in 2005

In the 1960s, Irish civil engineer William Lyttle dug a wine cellar under his Hackney property. Having done so, he said that he had "found a taste for the thing" and continued digging for forty years. Eventually, several tunnels on multiple levels led in all directions, under the property and surrounding grounds, some of them 18.2 metres (60 ft) long. After complaints by neighbours, a power supply interruption and a sinkhole in the pavement, the borough had a survey carried out that revealed the extent of the tunneling. Lyttle was evicted and the tunnels were filled with concrete.

=== William Schmidt ===
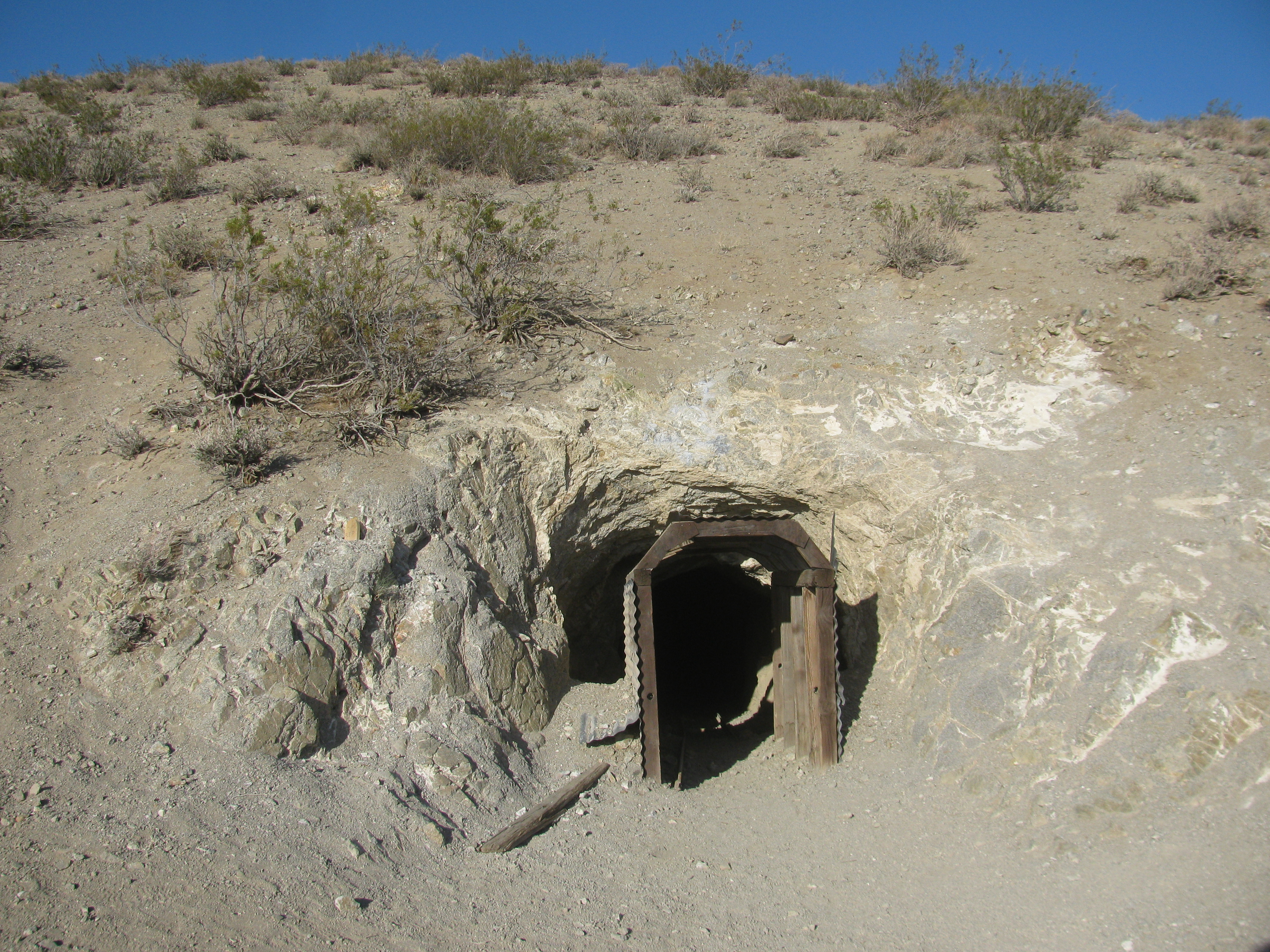
South entrance to the Burro Schmidt Tunnel

William "Burro" Schmidt was an American miner who spent 38 years drilling a 636-metre (2,087 ft) tunnel through solid granite. Construction began in 1902, with Schmidt claiming to be building a shortcut from his mining operation to the smelter. When a new road was constructed, rendering his shortcut obsolete, Schmidt carried on his work regardless. He used simple handtools and occasionally explosives for tunneling, carrying out the debris in a wheelbarrow or on the backs of his two donkeys.

=== Others ===
Costa Rican miner Manuel Barrantes has built an underground family house, consisting of hallways, bedrooms, conference rooms and a bathroom. The complex, totalling 186 square metres (2,000 sq ft), is used as a home and a museum.

The Williamson Tunnels are a network of tunnels in Liverpool, England, thought to have been dug under the direction of tobacco merchant Joseph Williamson between 1810 and 1840. Their purpose remains unknown, with some speculating that they were built as a folly.

In Butler, Pennsylvania, US man Ron Heist created a 50-room dwelling made of salvaged materials from abandoned places in the vicinity. It includes several tunnels Heist dug out and reinforced himself. A documentary film was made about him, entitled Mole Man.

In 1984, Russian Leonid Murlyanchik had the plan of digging a 6 kilometres (3.7 mi) tunnel towards the house of his beloved Ekaterina. However, after Ekaterina's son objected to the liaison, he changed his intention into building a subway system for his home city of Lebedyan. For 27 years Murlyanchik spent most of his hours, and his pension money, on the project. At his death in 2011 he had completed 300 metres (980 ft) of tunnel, which was subsequently closed off.

In late 2003, steeplejack and television personality Fred Dibnah began to dig a replica coal mine in the back garden of his home. Using traditional shaft-sinking techniques and the labour of mining friends Alf Molyneux and Jimmy Crooks, the shaft was sunk to a depth of 20 feet (6.1 m) and lined with brick. The work had been undertaken without planning permission, and, when the council eventually found out what was happening, they insisted he apply for planning permission. Dibnah died in 2004.

'Sandland' is a tunnel complex in western Wisconsin created by Eric Sutterlin, a contract mechanical engineer from the Minneapolis area. Sutterlin began digging tunnels in the Jordan Sandstone after purchasing the property in 2011, aided by a network of volunteers in the years since. Sutterlin estimates that as of January 2025, he has contributed more than $100,000 of his own money in developing Sandland. Designed to be an underground crawling maze, the tunnel complex contains a number of turns, dead-ends, and even hosts an underground bar. Future additions are slated to include an underground slide and a standing-level maze section. The site also hosts a number of aboveground attractions, including a decommissioned monorail from the Minnesota Zoo and a treehouse, the latter of which was moved to ground-level for safety reasons.

In 2015, a 10 metres (33 ft) tunnel was discovered in a Toronto park. After a few days of speculations in media, the use as a terrorist hideout being among them, young construction worker Elton McDonald came forward as its builder. Asked for the purpose of his digging, he answered "Honestly, I loved it so much. I don't know why I loved it".

YouTube personality and inventor Colin Furze has constructed an underground bunker and tunnel system under his home and workshop in Stamford, Lincolnshire, initially in 2015 as part of a promotion for Sky television's You, Me and the Apocalypse series.

TikTok creator Kala, or @engineer.everything, has been in the process of creating a tunnel system underneath her suburban home since August 2022.

== Press coverage ==
Several urban legends and hoaxes involving private tunnels have appeared in media. One such a story is about an Irishman who dug a tunnel from his bedroom to his local pub, without his wife noticing. In one version of the story, that did the rounds at least between 2014 and 2018, the tunneler is said to have used a spoon for digging.

When a tunnel in Calgary was discovered in 2016, a local newspaper ran a do it yourself tunneling manual as a story.

The 1997 novel The Underground Man is loosely based on the life and tunneling of the 5th Duke of Portland.

== See also ==
- Underground living
