= Tunnel Girl =

American TikToker

Tunnel Girl is an American TikToker known for her content surrounding the excavation of a tunnel under her house.

== Biography ==
The channel's creator, a woman named Kala, studied business and finance in college. After graduating, she entered the information technology field as a software engineer.

She bought a two-story home in Herndon, Virginia in 2010. She previously built a two-story addition at the back of her house, with a basement and subbasement underneath.

== Tunnel construction ==
In August 2022, Kala began construction on a storm shelter in her basement. To prepare, she studied FEMA shelter guidelines and a civil engineering book titled Rock Mass Classification — A Practical Approach in Civil Engineering. She began posting to TikTok about her tunnel construction in October 2022, telling viewers she was undertaking the project to challenge herself.

Kala's followers initially consisted primarily of electricians and mining and civil engineers.

In the course of excavating under her home, Kala also found building stones, which she began to mine and save for later projects. By August 2023, Kala had begun referring to the project as an "underground tunnel system", and had built a makeshift elevator to remove rock and dirt from the tunnel. Around the same time, her content had begun to reach more users, who expressed concerns about the safety and legality of her project.

By November 2023, she had accumulated 330,000 TikTok followers. At the time, she said she had spent about $50,000 on the project. Although Kala had undertaken the majority of work herself, her friends also occasionally helped.

On December 7, 2023, the tunnel was inspected by local building authorities and declared unsafe, and Kala was told to vacate her home until an engineer could evaluate the structure. In late December, concern continued to spread online regarding whether the tunnel could negatively impact Kala's neighbors. On December 31, Kala announced on her TikTok that town officials had told her to halt construction. She reassured her viewers that she would cooperate with a mandatory evaluation by an engineer, and would continue to pursue proper permitting. At the time, she had more than 500,000 followers.

In March 2025, Kala told Fox 5 DC that her tunnel got the approval from Herndon, including floor and structural plans, along with construction specifications of the "storm shelter." As of approval, the tunnel system is 22 feet below ground with a 30-foot entrance.

== See also ==
- Hobby tunneling
- Colin Furze, another tunneling social media figure
- Nick Tobler, TikToker known as the "eel pit guy"
