= Meulman =

Meulman is a surname. Notable people with the surname include:

- Jacqueline Meulman (born 1954), Dutch psychologist
- Niels Shoe Meulman (born 1967), Dutch visual artist, graffiti writer, graphic designer and art director

== See also ==
- Meuleman (disambiguation page)
