= Scott Meuleman =

Australian cricketer (born 1980)

Scott Meuleman (born 17 July 1980) is an Australian cricketer. He is a right-hand opening batsman and occasional leg-break googly bowler.

Meuleman, is of partial German ancestry, he is a third-generation Western Australian cricketer, with his father Robert Meuleman playing 14 first-class matches for WA between 1968/69 and 1971/72, and his grandfather Ken Meuleman playing 117 First-class matches for Western Australia and Victoria including a solitary test match.

He attended school at Wesley College in South Perth.
