= Ken Meuleman =

Australian cricketer

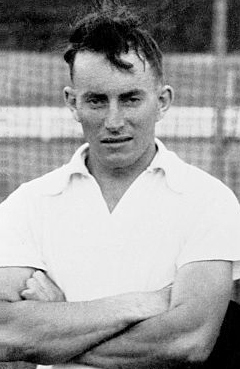
- Meuleman in 1946

Personal information
- Born: 5 September 1923; Melbourne, Victoria, Australia
- Died: 10 September 2004 (aged 81); Nedlands, Western Australia
- Batting: Right-handed
- Bowling: Legbreak

International information
- National side: Australia
- Only Test (cap 167): 29 March 1946 v New Zealand

Career statistics
Competition	Test	First-class
Matches	1	117
Runs scored	0	7,855
Batting average	0.00	47.60
100s/50s	0/0	22/41
Top score	0	234*
Balls bowled	–	1,247
Wickets	–	19
Bowling average	–	50.31
5 wickets in innings	–	0
10 wickets in match	–	0
Best bowling	–	3/7
Catches/stumpings	1/–	35/–
- Source: CricInfo, 12 October 2022

Kenneth Douglas Meuleman (5 September 1923 – 10 September 2004) was an Australian cricketer who played in one Test match in 1946. His cricket career started in Victoria, but after moving to Perth, Western Australia, he established himself as an important member of the State Sheffield Shield team between 1945/46 and 1960/61. He captained the side for a number of seasons.

He also established a still operating sporting goods store in Perth called Meuleman's Cricket Centre as well as coaching and developing the sport, including particularly the development of Justin Langer. Born to parents of German ancestry, his son Robert Meuleman and grandson Scott Meuleman have also played for Western Australia.

== See also ==
- One Test Wonder
