= Robert Meuleman =

Australian cricketer (born 1949)

Robert Douglas Meuleman (born 6 September 1949 in Melbourne) was a Western Australian cricketer who played 14 first-class matches for Western Australia between 1968 and 1972.

Of partial German ancestry, his father, Ken Meuleman was also a first-class cricketer (played 1 Test for Australia) and son Scott Meuleman is also a first-class cricketer playing for Western Australia. He was the batting coach of former Australia wicket-keeper/batsman Adam Gilchrist. He is credited with giving Gilchrist the idea to bat with a squash ball in his batting gloves. Meuleman won the Australia State Junior Championships in 1967 & 1968 in squash.

== See also ==
- List of Western Australia first-class cricketers
