= William Lyttle =

Irish eccentric (1931–2010)

Mole House
- 121 Mortimer Road
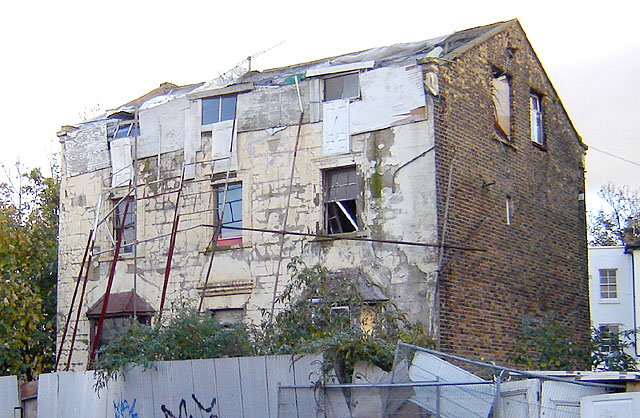
- 121 Mortimer Road in 2005, while Lyttle was living there
- Interactive map of the Mole House area

General information
- Architectural style: Victorian
- Location: 121 Mortimer Road, De Beauvoir Town, Hackney, London, United Kingdom
- Coordinates: 51°32′35.34″N 0°4′44.9″W
- Current tenants: Sue Webster
- Renovated: 2020

Design and construction
- Architect: David Adjaye (renovation)

William Lyttle (1931 – June 2010) was an Irish eccentric, notable for digging an extensive network of tunnels under his home in De Beauvoir Town, London.

Lyttle was dubbed "The Mole Man of Hackney" by the Hackney Gazette due to his digging, a nickname that was later adopted more widely by the press.

== Life ==
Lyttle arrived in London from his home country of Ireland in the mid-sixties when he inherited 121 Mortimer Road in the London borough of Hackney from his parents. Records show Lyttle's occupation listed as civil engineer but no evidence exists that he was qualified or ever had a career in civil engineering.

Lyttle excavated an extensive network of tunnels under his property and surrounding public and private land from the 1960s to 2000s. Rather than being a recluse, Lyttle was described as a rather chatty, eccentric, energetic character who would often be seen at local scrap yards and markets.

When asked by journalists why he excavates tunnels, Lyttle said "I'm a man who enjoys digging" and that he just wanted "a big basement". He also said that "There is great beauty in inventing things that serve no purpose."

After living in the property for over 40 years, Lyttle was evicted and moved to a hotel for three years at a cost of £45,000 (equivalent to £67,131 in 2023) to Hackney Council, before being rehoused in a flat in a high-rise building. He was put on the top floor, to discourage tunnelling.

In June 2010, months after moving in, Lyttle was found dead in his flat where it was discovered that he had created several holes in the walls and had removed a huge section of wall between the kitchen and living room.

Lyttle was survived by one daughter but the Metropolitan Police were unable to track her down and failed to establish any heir or surviving relatives. The police described Lyttle as having been a "wealthy man". The investigating officer is reported as saying "From documents and bank statements I've seen, let's just say his finances were a lot better than most people's."

Lyttle seldom engaged with journalists and the press but several attempts were made to document Lyttle's story in his lifetime including a cancelled Channel 4 documentary. In 2006 Lyttle allowed artist Karen Russo into his home who produced some of the only public photographs of the tunnel system. Russo described Lyttle's character as "extremely racist, misogynistic and paranoid" and antisemitic. This contrasted her preconceived ideal of showing him as a "model for understanding the artistic impulse and for the creative process". The project ended due to Lyttle's behaviour.

Photographer Tom Hunter described Lyttle as the Patron Saint of Hackney. His story has been described as "woven into the fabric of Hackney's history". Laureate Iain Sinclair included a chapter in his book, Hackney, That Rose-Red Empire, about Lyttle in which he chronicles the stories of London's "artists, the homeless, the eccentrics".

Upon his death, a fake blue plaque was hung outside the property to honour Lyttle as the man who "lived and dug here".

== 121 Mortimer Road ==
121 Mortimer Road is situated in De Beauvoir Town in Hackney, London. Originally, the plot contained two modest Victorian, terraced houses which Lyttle knocked-through and connected soon after acquiring the property.

Lyttle firstly dug out a wine cellar under his home and said that he had "found a taste for the thing" and kept on digging for the next forty years. He created a network of tunnels, wide and narrow, on several levels. Tunnels led in all directions, some of them up to 18 metres (59 ft) in length, and reaching as far down as the water table. One excavation connected with the Dalston Lane tunnel, and the railway line. Lyttle dumped the clay he dug up in his garden and sometimes in empty rooms of the house.

Lyttle's tunnelling remained a secret. However, he also carried out modifications to the main building, subdividing it into several "unevenly designed bedsits". He would rent out these bedsits to students and artists for cheap rent.

Lyttle's tunnelling attracted complaints from neighbours when sinkholes began to appear in the pavement and when water and power supplies were interrupted. The local pub also expressed concern that its cellar could collapse into one of Lyttle's tunnels. Serious complaints to Hackney Council started in or around the year 2000 leading to inspections but with no enforcement action taken.

In 2006, a large sink hole opened up spanning the road outside Lyttle's property revealing some of the tunnelling system below. This prompted further complaints and an ultrasound inspection was ordered revealing the extent of the tunnels.

In 1998 the area surrounding and including 121 Mortimer Road was designated a conservation area due to its "special architectural or historic interest", increasing pressure on the council to act.

== Legal challenges ==
Lyttle was evicted by order of the Court in 2006. He contested the decision and returned to his home for a short time before the appeal was dismissed. In 2008, the High Court of Justice ordered that Lyttle cover the costs of the council making the structure safe, at a total of £293,000 (equivalent to £493,863 in 2023).

== Property after Lyttle ==
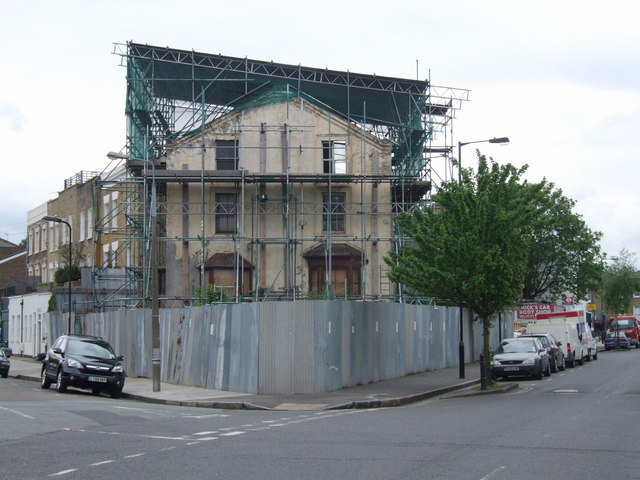
Lyttle's house in 2009, after his eviction

Lyttle was evicted in 2006 and Hackney Borough Council filled the tunnels with 2,000 tonnes of aerated concrete and removed 33 short tons (30 t) of rubble at a cost of £293,000 (equivalent to £535,478 in 2023). Lyttle was ordered to pay these costs but died still owing the debt.

33 short tons (30 t) of soil and debris were removed from Lyttle's former garden and from some of the rooms, including the wrecks of three cars and a boat.

A fake blue plaque was later hung outside the property to honour Lyttle.

Hackney council retained responsibility for the property until a buyer could be found. Upon completion of the sale the outstanding debts owed to the council would be due as well as a further £70,000 for maintenance costs incurred after the initial remedial works and £45,000 for hotel costs following Lyttle's eviction.

Andrew Fraser, a probate researcher, submitted a planning application to demolish the property and build a block of eight flats but this application was refused in November 2010 and again, later, on appeal. The Council said the demolition would result in "the loss of a building of local townscape merit, which is a heritage asset and makes a positive contribution to the special historic character of the De Beauvoir Conservation Area." Fraser claimed to be acting as administrator for the heirs of Lyttle. The property was listed for sale for £500,000 in 2011 with no planning consent granted but failed to sell. Fraser later obtained permission to demolish the building and rebuild two, three-storey town houses.

In 2012 the property was sold for £1.2 million (equivalent to £1.79 million in 2023) to artists Tim Noble and Sue Webster.

By 2020 the house, now named Mole House, had been renovated by the architect David Adjaye to create a home and studio for the artist Sue Webster following her divorce from her husband. Webster is reported as saying she opted not to knock the house down but to pay homage to Lyttle by keeping its yellowing facade, as well as whatever else could be salvaged of Lyttle's original work.

Mole House won "Best Dwelling" at the 2021 New London Awards.

== See also ==
- Hobby tunneling
- Williamson Tunnels
