= Smuggling tunnel =

Secret passages used for the smuggling of goods and people

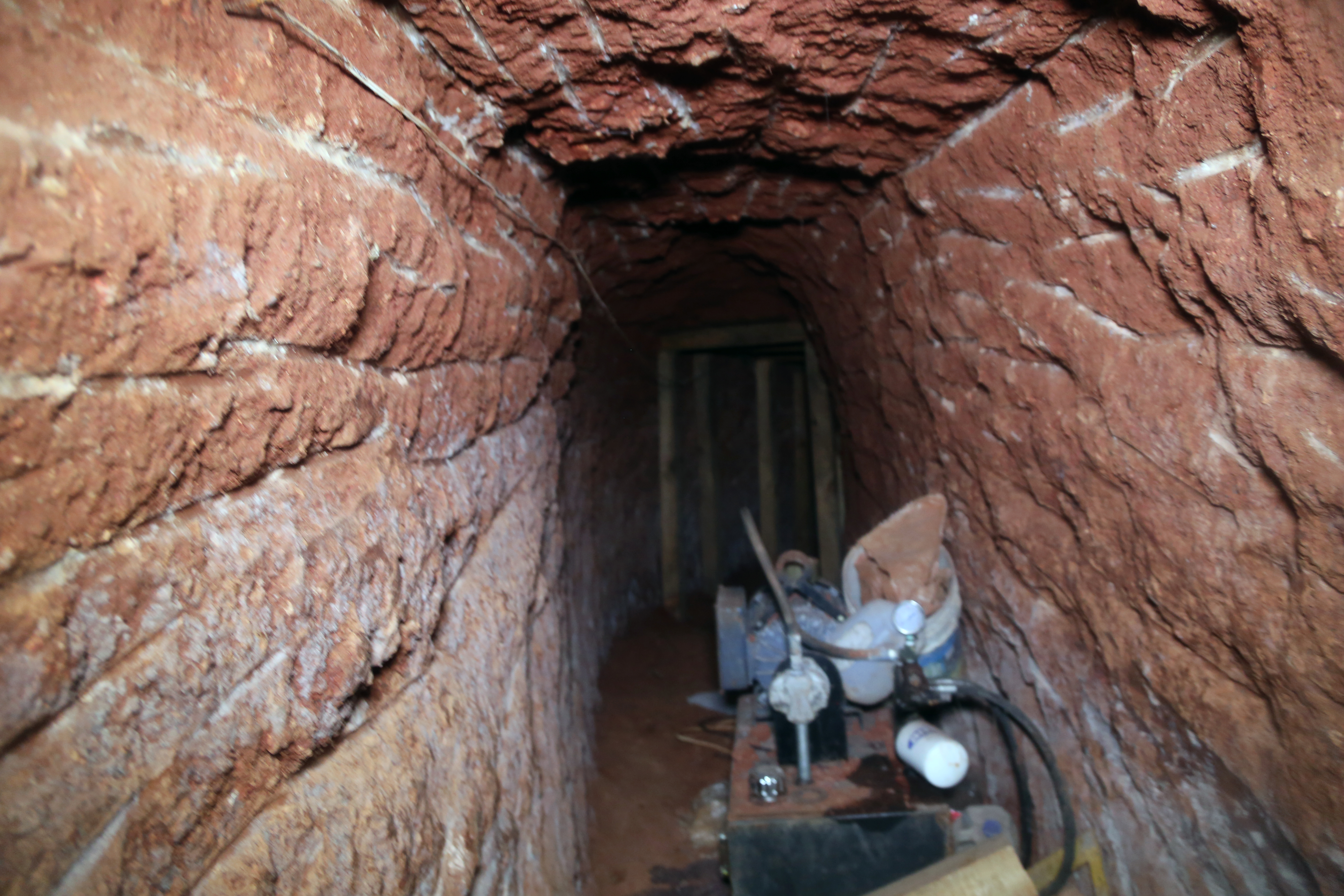
A drug smuggling tunnel in Arizona

Smuggling tunnels are secret passages used for the smuggling of goods and people. The term is also used where the tunnels are built in response to a siege.

== Europe ==
=== Bosnia ===
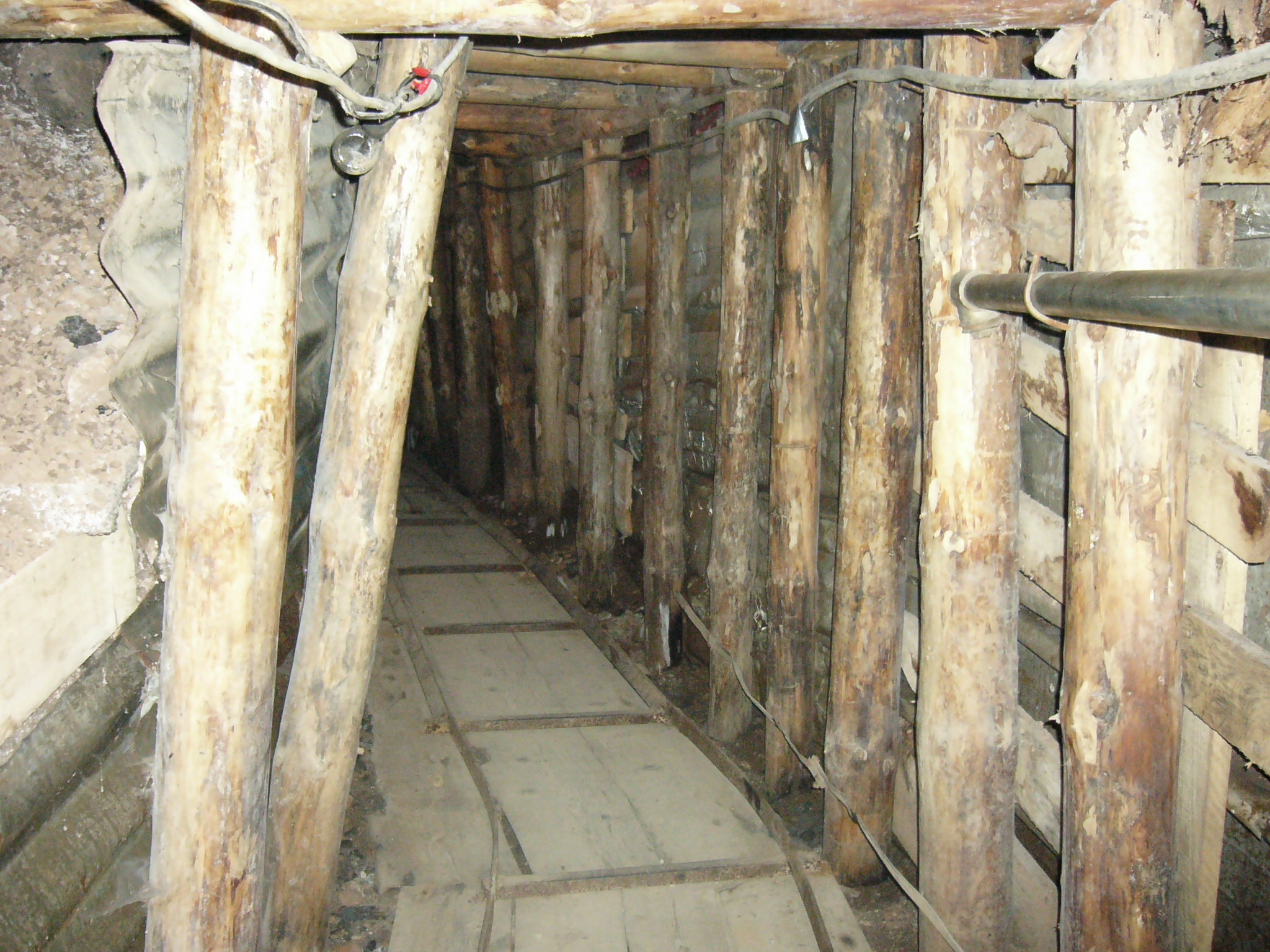
Sarajevo Tunnel

The Sarajevo Tunnel operated during the Siege of Sarajevo as a passage underneath the no-man's land of the city's (closed) airport, providing a vital smuggling link for the beleaguered city residents. Guns were smuggled into the city and people were smuggled out. After the Bosnian War, the Sarajevo Tunnel Museum was built onto the historic private house whose cellar served as the entrance to Sarajevo Tunnel.

In popular culture

- It features in the British film Welcome to Sarajevo (1997).
- A similar tunnel in an unknown city, probably Belgrade, features in a dark Serbian satire of conflict, Underground (1995).

=== Germany ===
More than 70 tunnels were used to smuggle people under the Berlin Wall between West Berlin and East Berlin.

=== Ukraine–Slovakia ===
A 700-meter smuggling tunnel with a narrow gauge railway was revealed in July 2012 between Uzhhorod, Ukraine, and Vyšné Nemecké, Slovakia, at the border of Schengen Area. The tunnel used professional mining and security technologies. It was used primarily for smuggling of cigarettes.

=== United Kingdom ===
Many villages on the southern coast of England have a local legend of a smugglers' tunnel, although the entrances to most of the actual smugglers' tunnels have been lost or bricked up.

Some tunnel stories turn out to be plausible, such as the tunnel at Hayle in Cornwall, which seems to have been built specifically for smuggling. However, tunnels often double as a storm drain or some other functional channel, or else as an extension of a natural fissure in the rock as at Methleigh and Porthcothan, but tunnels and caches (both wholly excavated and formed by extending natural formations) are more commonplace where covert landings in areas with few sheltered beaches exposed smugglers to the attentions of the Revenue Men.

While many sites are rudimentary, extensive workings have been found which show evidence of skillful excavation, strongly implying the assistance of tin miners.

Beith in North Ayrshire was a notorious haunt of smugglers at one time, and legend has it that a tunnel ran from the town centre down to Kilbirnie Loch.

== North America ==
=== US–Canada ===
In early 2005, a group of Canadian drug smugglers took up the idea, and constructed a tunnel between a greenhouse in Langley, British Columbia and the basement of a house in Lynden, Washington, which lay across the ditch marking the Canada–US border. The house on the Langley side was on 0 Avenue ("Zero Avenue"), which runs parallel to the border and is the baseline of Langley's avenue-numbering system. They bought the two properties and began construction work. Authorities were alerted when a neighbor noticed the large-scale construction work being undertaken in the greenhouse. Inspection revealed that tons of construction material were entering, and piles of earth were coming out.

It became known within a short time, by both American and Canadian border authorities, that a tunnel was being built. Video and audio devices were installed secretly by United States customs officials both at the termini and in the tunnel itself. On July 14, the tunnel having been completed, the first packs of marijuana began going through. Officials raided the home soon afterward and arrested the three men, who then appeared before court in Seattle. The tunnel was sealed and the roads above it were rebuilt, but the US house where the tunnel exited still exists.

=== US–Mexico ===
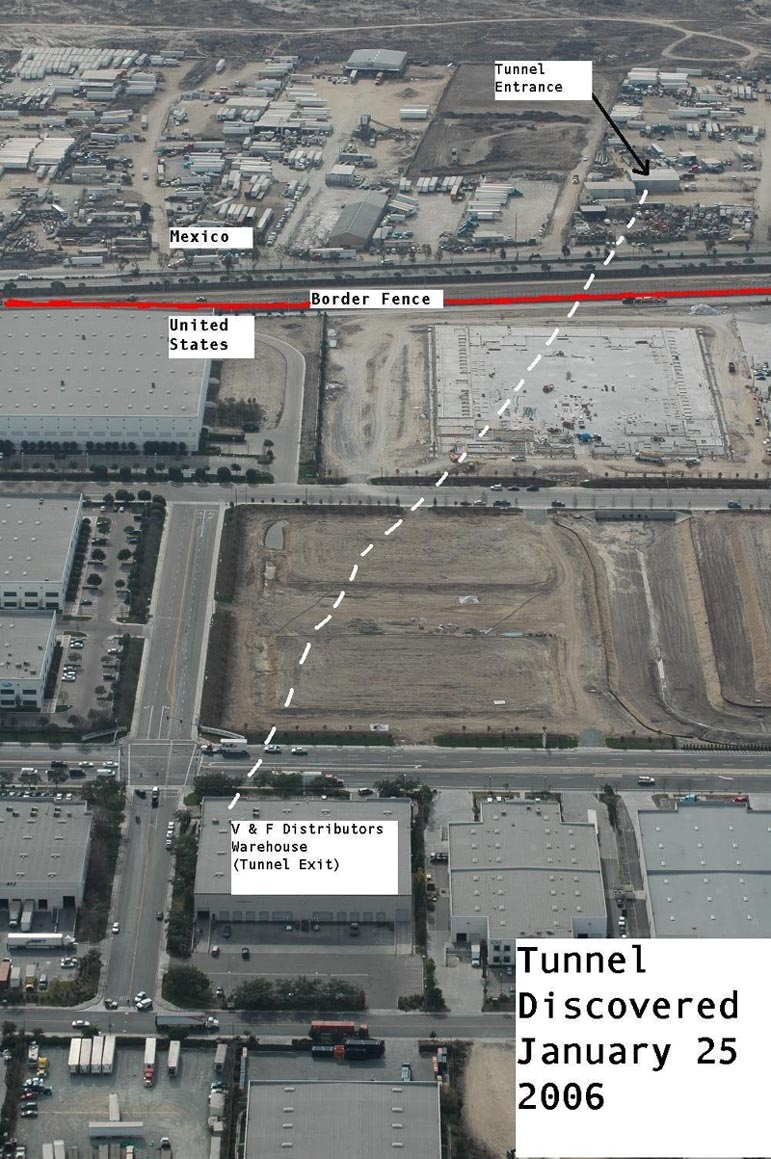
Route of a Sinaloa Cartel drug tunnel under the US/Mexico border

As of September 30, 2015, 183 illicit cross-border tunnels have been discovered in the United States since Fiscal Year 1990.

On January 25, 2006, a tunnel was found on the US-Mexico border by a joint US Drug Enforcement Administration, US Immigration and Customs Enforcement, and US Border Patrol task force. The 2,400-foot (730 m) long tunnel runs from a warehouse near the Tijuana airport to a warehouse in San Diego. When discovered, it was devoid of people, but it did contain 2 short tons (1,800 kg) of marijuana. It was 5 feet (1.5 m) high and up to 90 feet (27 m) deep. The floor was made of cement, and the walls were exposed clay, with lights lining one side, a ventilation system to keep fresh air circulating, and a water drainage system to remove infiltrating ground water. Authorities said it was unclear how long the tunnel had been in operation.

On January 30, US Immigrations and Customs Enforcement agents arrested a Mexican citizen who was linked to the tunnel via the US warehouse, operated by V&F Distributors LLC. On the Friday before, January 27, immigration authorities reportedly received information that the Mexican cartel behind the operation was threatening the lives of any agents involved with the construction or occupation of the tunnel. US Customs and Immigration, however, pledged to protect them as best they could. Authorities believe Tijuana's Arellano-Felix drug syndicate, or some other well-known drug cartel, was behind the building and operation of the tunnel.

On November 26, 2010, a 2,600-foot (790 m) tunnel was discovered linking Tijuana to Otay Mesa, San Diego, California. In the same month another tunnel was discovered between these two cities. Both tunnels were discovered by a San Diego task force and are believed to be the work of Mexico's Sinaloa cartel. Over 40 short tons (36,000 kg) of cannabis was found and confiscated between the two.

An analysis of US-Mexico smuggling tunnels, the US-Canada smuggling tunnel, and the smuggling tunnels in Rafah, Gaza Strip, was completed by Lichtenwald and Perri as part of a transnational analysis of smuggling tunnels. Lichtenwald and Perri outlined sources and methods for evaluating which tunnels are used by different populations in various parts of the world to smuggle contraband that does not threaten a nation's security, which tunnels that smuggle contraband that does threaten a nation's security, and hybrid tunnels that smuggle contraband that threaten a nation's security as well as that which does not.

In December 2012, a tunnel 3 feet in diameter and 100 yards long, with electricity and ventilation, was found near the Nogales, Arizona, port of entry. On February 14, 2014, another underground drug tunnel was discovered in Nogales.

The tunnel spanned 481 feet (147 m), or longer than 1.5 American football fields. The tunnel was being used to smuggle marijuana and other drugs into the US. Another 590 pounds (270 kg) of marijuana was seized after federal agents stopped a vehicle they saw driving away from the residence. Some 46 pounds (21 kg) of marijuana and 0.5 pounds (0.23 kg) of heroin were found inside the tunnel. Three people have been arrested in connection with the bust.

On March 19, 2020, a tunnel connecting Tijuana to San Diego was discovered by the San Diego Tunnel Task Force. The tunnel extended 2,000 feet (610 m) and was outfitted with an underground rail system, ventilation, and lighting. Over 1,300 pounds (590 kilograms) of cocaine, 86 pounds (39 kilograms) of methamphetamine, 17 pounds (7.7 kilograms) of heroin, 3,000 pounds (1,400 kilograms) of marijuana and 2 pounds (0.91 kilograms) of fentanyl were seized.

In May 2022, a tunnel connecting Tijuana to San Diego was discovered. The tunnel extended "six football fields" in length and was outfitted with an underground rail system, ventilation, and an electricity supply. Over 1,762 pounds (799 kg) of cocaine, 165 pounds (75 kg) of meth and 3.5 pounds (1.6 kg) of heroin were seized.

== Asia ==
=== India–Pakistan ===
Pakistan has been using tunnels to infiltrate terrorists and smuggle weapons, explosives, contrabands to India. These terrorists belong to globally sanctioned proscribed organizations like LeT, JeM and Hizbul Mujahideen.

Since 1997, a total of 12 tunnels (5 in Punjab frontier and 7 in Jammu frontier) have been discovered by BSF under the India-Pakistan Border, with latest being discovered in 2021. The Tunnel discovered in 2021 was also used by Mohammad Umar Farooq, the Main planner of 2019 Pulwama attack in Jammu and Kashmir. These tunnels are constructed by Engineer Wing of Pakistan Rangers and Pakistan Army Corps of Engineers.

=== India–Bangladesh ===
Throughout the years, Border Security Force has discovered several smuggling tunnels linking India with Bangladesh, these tunnels are used by Bangladeshi criminals to smuggle cattle, contraband and illegal immigrants.

=== North Korea–South Korea ===
As of 1990, as many as four tunnels linking North Korea to South Korea have been discovered by South Korean authorities under the Demilitarized Zone. It is believed that the tunnels were planned as a military invasion route or to facilitate intelligence operations as opposed to smuggling controlled items. It is believed that there may be up to 20 tunnels crossing the border, however neither government has acknowledged the discovery or existence other than the four known tunnels.

The third tunnel is now open to South Korean visitors as a tourist site, however the tunnel has been permanently blocked with three concrete barriers at the Military Demarcation Line between North and South Korea. It can be accessed via a second tunnel dug by South Korean authorities in 1978 to intercept the then yet incomplete North Korean tunnel. The North Korean portion was 1,635 metres (1.016 miles) long, with a maximum height of 1.95 metres (6 feet 5 inches), 2.1 metres (6 feet 11 inches) wide, and at a depth of 73 m (240 ft) below ground. It has been estimated that up to 30,000 men per hour could travel through the tunnel with light weaponry.

=== Middle East ===
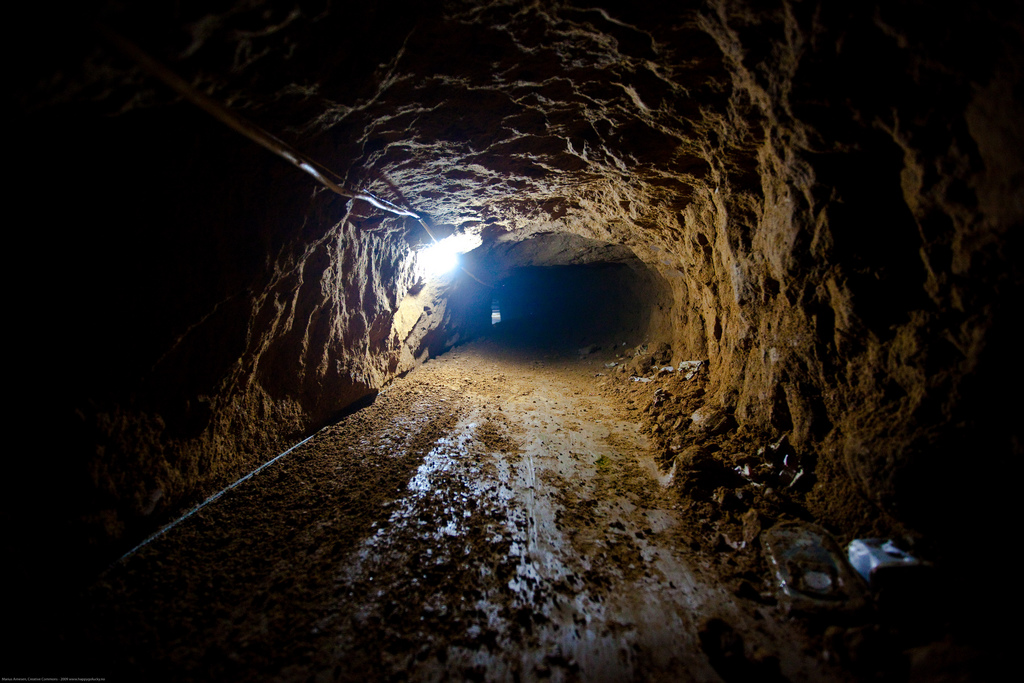
Smuggling tunnel in Rafah, Gaza Strip (2009)

The Gaza Strip smuggling tunnels connect Egypt and the Gaza Strip, bypassing the Egypt–Gaza barrier built by Israel along the international border established by the Egypt–Israel peace treaty. The tunnels pass under the Philadelphi corridor, an area specified in the Oslo accords as being under Israeli military control, in order to secure the border with Egypt.

== See also ==
- Secret passage
