= Battle of Jenin (2002) =

Battle of the Second Intifada

Coordinates: 32°27′37.04″N 35°18′4.88″E

- Part of Operation Defensive Shield and the Second Intifada
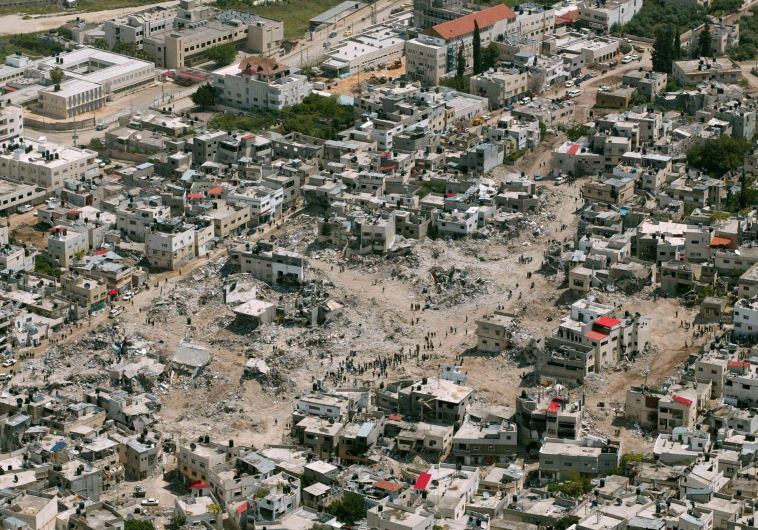
- Aerial photograph of the battle area in Jenin, taken two days after the battle ended
Date	April 1–11, 2002 (Israeli troop withdrawal began April 18)
Location	Jenin, Israeli-occupied West Bank
Result	Israeli victory

Belligerents
Israel; Israel Defense Forces	Palestinian Authority; Fatah; Preventive Security Force; Al-Aqsa Martyrs' Brigades; Tanzim; Hamas; Palestinian Islamic Jihad; Independent Palestinian mujahid factions

Commanders and leaders
(Israel) Yehuda Yedidya (Israel) Eyal Shlein (Israel) Ofek Buchris	(Palestine) Yosef Qabha † (Palestine) Zakaria Zubeidi (Palestine) Mahmoud Tawalbe †

Strength
1 reserve infantry brigade 2 regular infantry battalions Commando teams 12 D9 armored bulldozers	Some 200 – several hundreds

Casualties and losses
23 dead 52 wounded	52 dead (at least 27 militants and 22 civilians) per HRW; 53 dead (48 militants and 5 civilians) per the IDF
- Dozens of houses destroyed according to the IDF according to HRW at least 140 buildings completely destroyed, severe damage caused 200 additional buildings rendered uninhabitable or unsafe.

The Battle of Jenin, took place in the Jenin refugee camp in the Israeli-occupied West Bank on April 1–11, 2002. The Israeli military invaded the camp, and other areas under the administration of the Palestinian Authority, during the Second Intifada, as part of Operation Defensive Shield.

Israeli forces employed infantry, commando forces, and assault helicopters. Palestinian militants had prepared for a fight, booby trapping locations throughout the camp, and after an Israeli column walked into an ambush, the army began to rely more heavily on the use of armored bulldozers. On April 11, Palestinian militants began to surrender. Israeli troops began withdrawing from the camp on April 18.

Despite reports of a widespread massacre numbering hundreds of casualties by some Palestinian officials, subsequent investigations found no evidence to substantiate it, and official totals from Palestinian and Israeli sources confirmed between 52 and 54 Palestinians, including civilians, and 23 Israeli soldiers as having been killed in the fighting. Israel did not allow emergency workers into the camp after the battle with Palestinian militants had ended, drawing condemnation from a UN envoy. The battle led to widespread destruction of the camp, as at least 140 buildings were completely destroyed, and severe damage was caused to 200 additional buildings rendered uninhabitable or unsafe.

== Naming ==
According to Palestinian writer Ramzy Baroud, the event is "known by many as the Jenin massacre".

== Background ==
The Jenin refugee camp was established in 1953 within Jenin's municipal boundaries on land that the United Nations Relief and Works Agency (UNRWA) leased from the government of Jordan, who at the time ruled the West Bank until 1967. Covering an area of 0.423 square kilometers, in 2002, it was home to 13,055 UNRWA registered Palestinian refugees. Most of the camp's residents originally hail from the Carmel mountains and region of Haifa, and many maintain close ties with their relatives inside the Green Line. Other camp residents include Palestinians from Gaza and Tulkarm who moved into the area in the late 1970s, and those who came from Jordan after the establishment of the Palestinian Authority (PA) with the signing of the Oslo Accords in 1993.

Camp militants repelled attempts by PA seniors to exercise authority in the camp. In a February 2002 show of force, residents burned seven vehicles that were sent by the governor of Jenin and opened fire on the PA men. Ata Abu Rumeileh was designated the chief security officer of the camp by its residents. He oversaw access to the entrances to the camp, instituted roadblocks, investigated "suspicious characters" and kept unwanted strangers away.

Known to Palestinians as "the martyrs' capital", the camp had some 200 militants, included members of Al-Aqsa Martyrs Brigades, Tanzim, Palestinian Islamic Jihad (PIJ) and Hamas. By Israel's count, at least 28 suicide bombers were dispatched from the Jenin camp from 2000 to 2003 during the Second Intifada. One of the key planners for several of the attacks was Mahmoud Tawalbe, who worked in a record store while also heading the local PIJ cell. Israeli army weekly Bamahane attributes at least 31 militant attacks, totaling 124 victims, to Jenin during the same period, more than any other city in the West Bank.

Prior to the undertaking of the Israeli operation the IDF Spokesman attributed 23 suicide bombings and 6 attempted bombings against civilians in Israel to Palestinians from Jenin. Major attacks and suicide bombings perpetrated by Palestinian militant groups from Jenin included the Matza restaurant suicide bombing, a Palestinian suicide bombing of an Israeli Arab-owned restaurant in Haifa, Israel which has been called a massacre and resulted in the deaths of 16 Israeli civilians, and over 40 more civilians being injured.

== Prelude ==
Days prior, a suicide bombing attack on a Passover celebration in Netanya resulted in at least 30 casualties and 140 wounded. Israel's Operation Defensive Shield began on March 29 with an incursion into Ramallah, followed by Tulkarem and Qalqilya on April 1, Bethlehem on April 2, and Jenin and Nablus on April 3. By this date, six Palestinian cities and their surrounding towns, villages, and refugee camps, had been occupied by the IDF.

Limited Israeli forces had entered the camp along a single route twice in the previous month; they encountered heavy resistance and quickly withdrew. Unlike other camps, the organizations in Jenin had a joint commander: Yosef Ahmad Rayhan Qabha, known as "Abu Jandal," an officer in the Palestinian National and Islamic Forces who had fought in Lebanon, served in the Iraqi Army, and who had been involved in several encounters with the IDF. He set up a war room and divided the camp into fifteen sub-sectors, deploying about twenty armed men in each. During the battle, he began calling himself "The Martyr Abu Jandal".

After an IDF action in Ramallah in March resulted in television broadcast footage that was considered unflattering, the IDF high command decided not to allow reporters to join the forces. Like other cities targeted in Defensive Shield, Jenin was declared a "closed military zone" and placed under curfew before the entrance of Israeli troops, remaining sealed off throughout the invasion. Water and electricity supplies to the city were also cut off and remained unavailable to residents throughout.

=== Booby-trapping of homes and buildings ===
Since the previous Israeli withdrawal, Palestinian militants had prepared by boobytrapping both the town and camp's streets in a bid to trap Israeli soldiers. Following his surrender to Israeli forces, Thabet Mardawi, an Islamic Jihad fighter, said that Palestinian fighters had spread "between 1000 and 2000 bombs and booby traps" throughout the camp, some big ones for tanks (weighing as much as 113 kilograms), most others the size of water bottles. "Omar the Engineer", a Palestinian bombmaker, said that some 50 homes were booby trapped: "We chose old and empty buildings and the houses of men who were wanted by Israel because we knew the soldiers would search for them." More powerful bombs with remote detonators were placed inside trash bins in the street and inside the cars of wanted men. Omar said that everyone in the camp, including children, knew where the explosives were located, and noted that this constituted a major weakness to their defenses, since during the Israeli incursion, the wires to more than a third of the bombs were cut by soldiers guided by Palestinian collaborators.

=== Evacuation orders and start of fighting ===
According to Efraim Karsh, before the fighting started, the IDF used loudspeakers broadcasting in Arabic to urge the locals to evacuate the camp, and he estimates that some 11,000 left. Stephanie Gutmann also said that the IDF used bullhorns and announcements in Arabic to inform the residents of the invasion, and that the troops massed outside the camp for a day because of rain. She estimated that 1,200 remained in the camp, but that it was impossible to tell how many of them were fighters. After the battle, Israeli intelligence estimated that half the population of noncombatants had left before the invasion, and 90% had done so by the third day, leaving around 1,300 people. Others estimated that 4,000 people had remained in the camp. Some camp residents reported hearing the Israeli calls to evacuate, while others said they did not. Many thousands did leave the camp, with women and children usually permitted to move into the villages in the surrounding hills or the neighbouring city. However, the men who left were almost all temporarily detained. Instructed by Israeli soldiers to strip before they were taken away, journalists who entered Jenin following the invasion remarked that heaps of discarded clothing in the ruined streets showed where they were taken into custody.

As the fighting started, Ali Safouri, a commander of the Islamic Jihad's Al-Quds Brigades in the camp, said: "We have prepared unexpected surprises for the enemy. We are determined to pay him back double, and teach him a lesson he will not forget. ... We will attack him on the home front, in Jerusalem, in Haifa, and in Jaffa, everywhere. We welcome them, and we have prepared a special graveyard in the Jenin camp for them. We swore on the martyrs that we would place a curfew on the Zionist cities and avenge every drop of blood spilled upon our sacred land. We call on the soldiers of Sharon to refuse his orders, because entering the [Jenin] camp... the capital of the martyrs' [operations], will, Allah willing, be the last thing they do in their lives".

The Israeli command sent in three thrusts consisting mainly of the reservist 5th Infantry Brigade from the town of Jenin to the north, as well as a company of the Nahal Brigade from the southeast and Battalion 51 of the Golani Brigade from the southwest. The force of 1,000 troops also included Shayetet 13 and Duvdevan Unit special forces, the Armored Corps, and Combat Engineering Corps with armored bulldozer for neutralizing the roadside bombs that would line the alleys of the camp according to Military Intelligence. The 5th Infantry Brigade did not have any experience in close quarters combat and did not have a commander when Operation Defensive Shield started, since the last commander's service ended a few days earlier. His substitute was a reserve officer, Lieutenant Colonel Yehuda Yedidya, who got his rank after the operation began. His soldiers were not trained for urban fighting. Anticipating the heaviest resistance in Nablus, IDF commanders sent two regular infantry brigades there, assuming they could take over the Jenin camp in 48–72 hours with just the one reservist brigade. The force's entry was delayed until April 2 due to rain and delays with transporting equipment.

== Battle ==
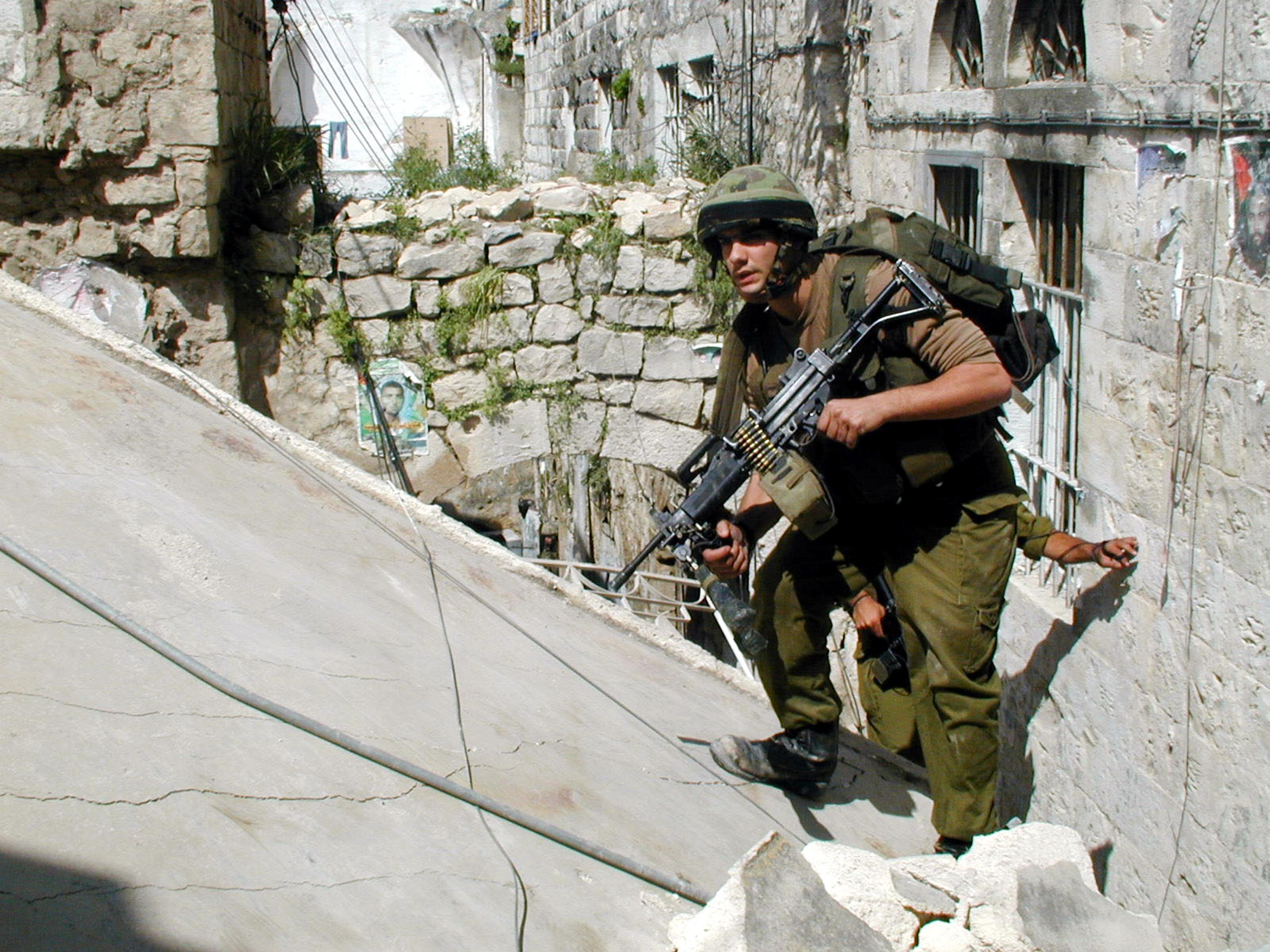
Israeli soldiers in Jenin

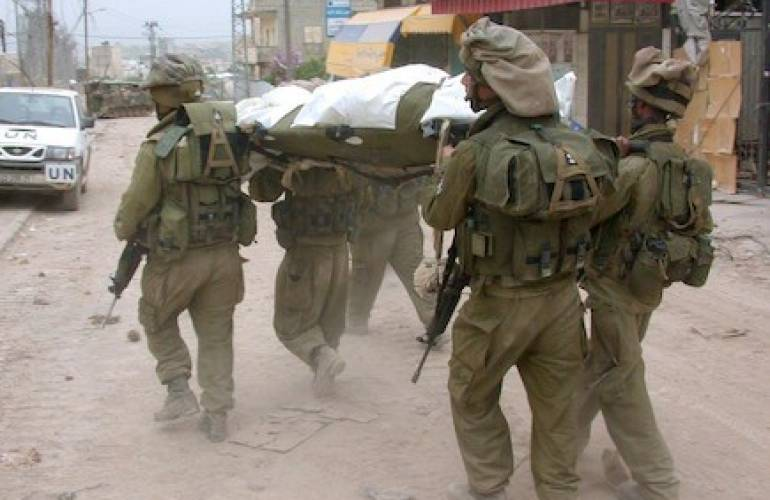
A wounded Israeli soldier being evacuated

Israeli forces entered Jenin on April 2. On the first day, reserve company commander Major Moshe Gerstner was killed in a PIJ sector. This caused a further delay. By April 3, the city was secured, but the fighting in the camp was just beginning. Israeli sources say that the IDF incursion into the camp relied primarily on infantry to minimize civilian casualties, but interviews with eyewitnesses suggest that tanks and helicopters were also used in the first two days. Captured Palestinian fighters subsequently told their interrogators that they had anticipated greater use of Israeli air power, not expecting the Israelis to risk heavier casualties in house-to-house fighting. Ata Abu Roumileh, a Fatah leader in the camp, later said that it was only when his forces saw the Israelis advancing on foot that they decided to stay and fight. Thabet Mardawi recalled that "I couldn't believe it when I saw the soldiers. The Israelis knew that any soldier who went into the camp like that was going to get killed."

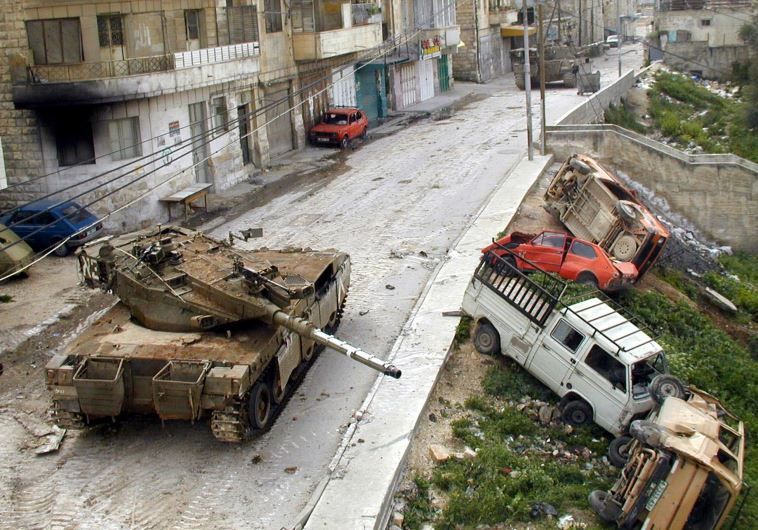
An Israeli tank in Jenin

To reach the camp, a Caterpillar D-9 armored bulldozer drove along a three-quarter-mile stretch of the main street to clear it of booby traps. An Israeli Engineering Corps officer logged 124 separate explosions set off by the bulldozer.

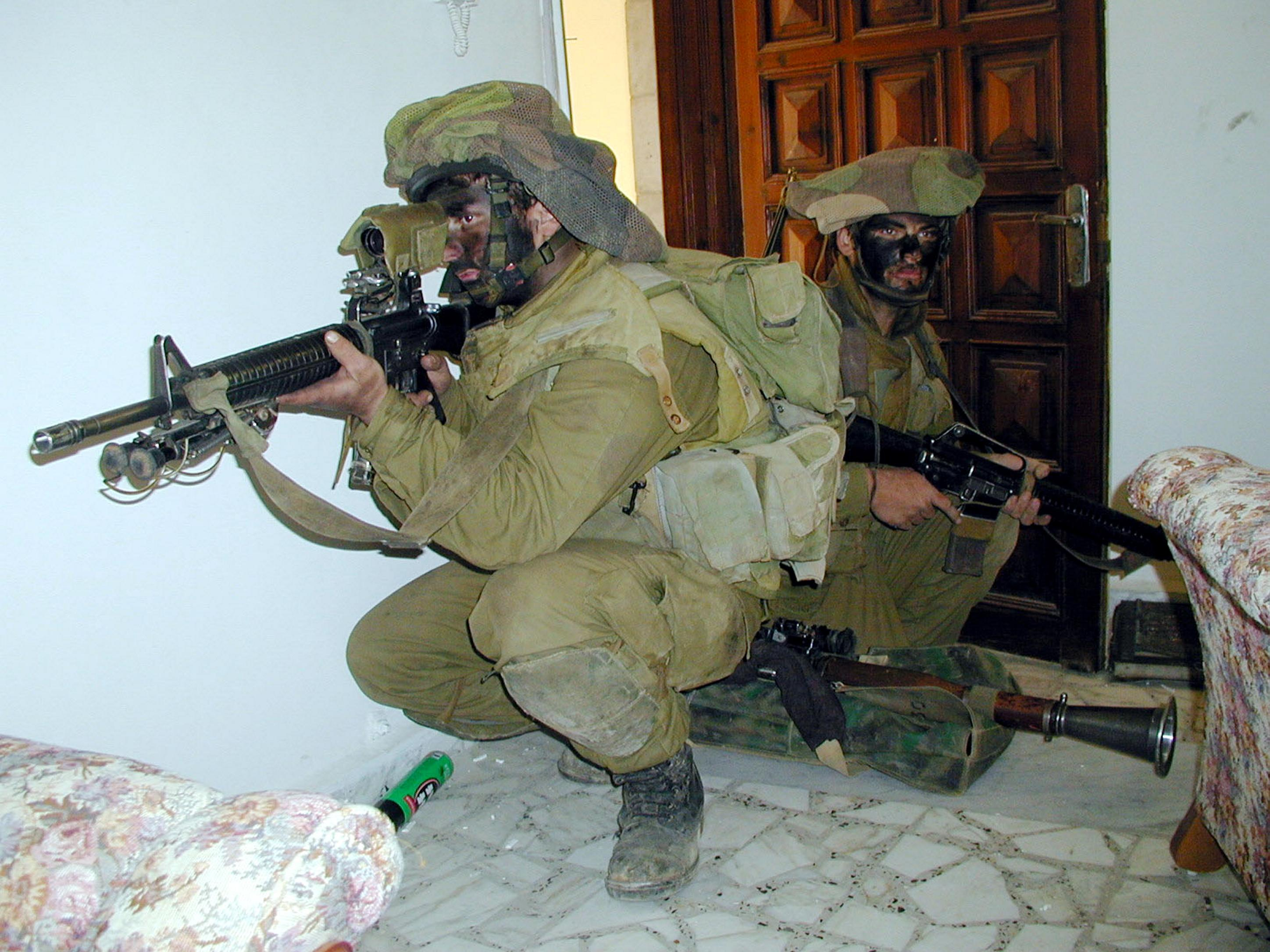
Israeli soldiers occupying a building during the fighting

On the third day, the Palestinians were still dug in, defying Israeli expectations, and by then seven Israeli soldiers had been killed. Mardawi later testified to having killed two of them from close range, using an M-16. As the IDF advanced, the Palestinians fell back to the heavily defended camp center – the Hawashin district. AH-1 Cobra helicopters were used to strike Palestinian positions on rooftops using wire-guided missiles, and about a dozen armored D-9 bulldozers were deployed, widening alleys, clearing paths for tanks, and detonating booby traps. Palestinians said that Israeli troops rode atop the bulldozers and fired rocket propelled grenades.

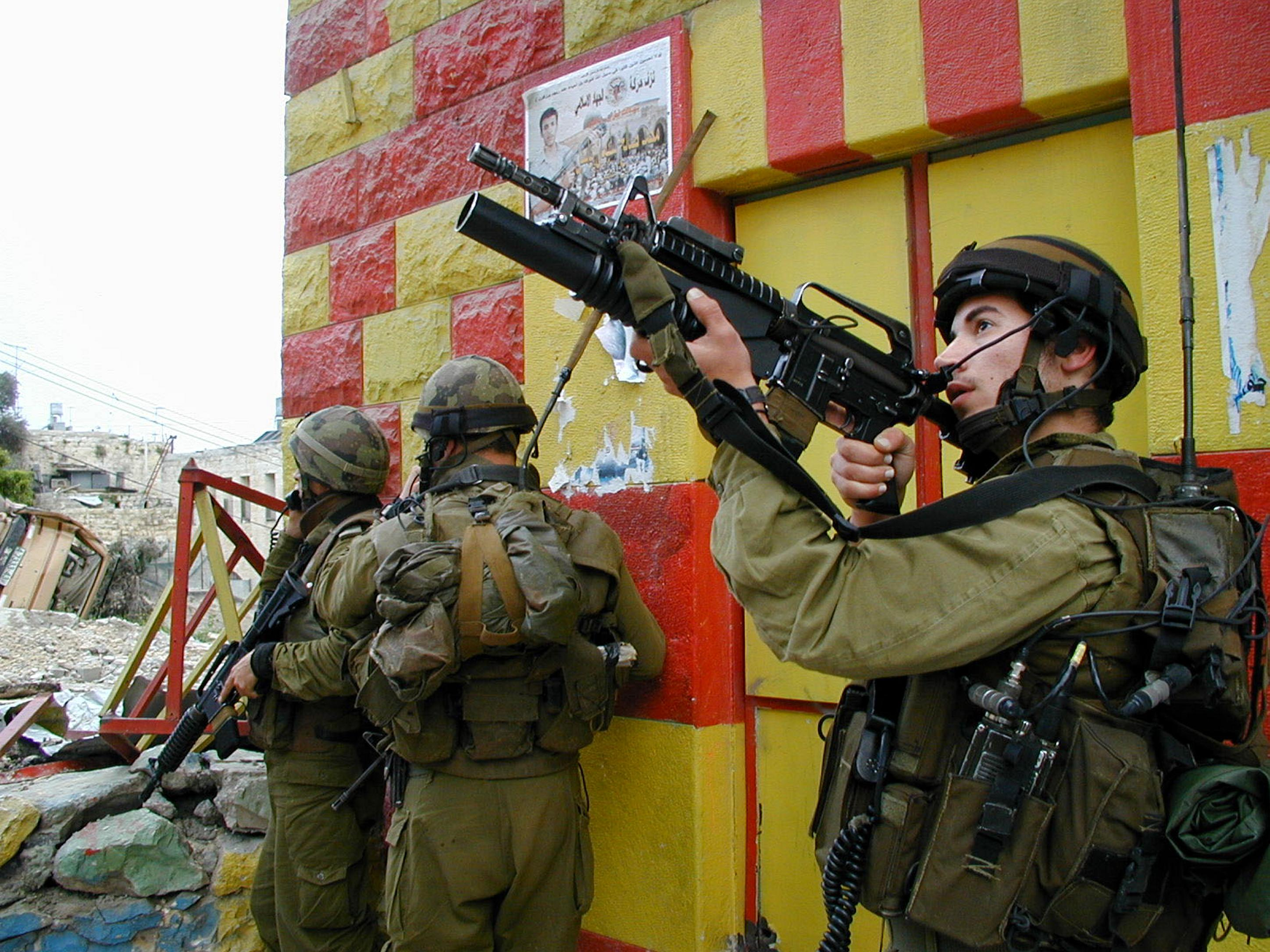
Israeli soldiers during operational activity in Jenin

On April 6, Mahmoud Tawalbe and two other militants went into a house so as to get close enough to a tank or armored D-9 bulldozer to plant a bomb. Tawalbe and another militant were killed during the action. A British military expert working in the camp for Amnesty International reported that a D9 driver saw him, and subsequently rammed a wall down onto him and one of his fighters. The Islamic Jihad website announced that Tawalbe had died when he blew up in his booby-trapped home on the Israeli soldiers inside it, and that he "had thwarted all attempts by the occupation to evacuate the camp residents to make it easier for the Israelis to destroy [the camp] on the heads of the fighters." On that same day, IDF attack helicopters reportedly increased their missile attacks, which slowed but did not cease the next day.

IDF chief of staff (Ramatkal) Shaul Mofaz urged the officers to speed things up. They asked for twenty-four more hours. Mofaz told reporters that the fighting would be complete by the end of the week, April 6. In some of the sectors, the forces were advancing at a rate of fifty meters a day. Israeli intelligence assumed that the vast majority of the camp's residents were still in it. Most commanders argued that this obligated a careful advance for fear of striking civilians, and warned that using excessive force would cost the lives of hundreds of Palestinians. Lieutenant Colonel Ofek Buchris, commander of the 51st Battalion, was left in a minority opinion, saying "We're being humiliated here for four days now". When Mofaz instructed the officers to be more aggressive and fire five antitank missiles at every house before entering, one of them contemplated disobedience. Meanwhile, when asked how long he thought his forces could last given the superiority of the Israeli forces, Abu Jandal said: "No. That's not true. We have the weapon of surprise. We have the weapon of honor. We have the divine weapon, the weapon of Allah who stands at our side. We have weapons that are better than theirs. I am the one with the truth, and I put my faith in Allah, while they put their faith in a tank".

Buchris continued to employ the tactics of softening up enemy resistance with antitank fire and extensive use of bulldozers, developing a method to expose IDF soldiers to less risk: first, a bulldozer would ram the corner of a house, opening a hole, and then an IDF Achzarit troop carrier would arrive to disembark troops into the house, where they would clear it of any militants found inside. Buchris' battalion was advancing faster than the reserve forces, creating a bridgehead within the camp that attracted most of the Palestinian fire. During the first week of fighting, the battalion suffered five casualties. On April 8, the Golani Brigade's commander, Colonel Moshe Tamir, arrived from Nablus. Having crawled with Buchris to the front line, he warned that the fighting style must be changed completely – call in more troops and perhaps take the command out of the reserve brigade's hand. By evening, division commander Brigadier General Eyal Shlein told his men that the mission must be accomplished by 6:00 PM on April 9. Buchris himself was later badly wounded.

At 6:00 AM on April 9, reserve battalion 7020's support company was ordered to form a new line, west of the former one. Its commander, Major Oded Golomb, set out with a force to take a position in a new house. He strayed from the original path, perhaps for tactical considerations, but failed to report to his commander. The force walked into a Palestinian ambush, finding themselves in an inner courtyard surrounded by tall houses (later nicknamed "the bathtub") and under fire from all directions, and were also attacked by a suicide bomber. Rescue forces from the company and the battalion hurried to the location and were attacked with small-arms fire and explosive charges. The exchange of fire went on for several hours.

A reconnaissance aircraft documented much of the fight and the footage was transmitted live and was watched in the Israeli Central Command war room by the high-ranking officers. Thirteen Israeli soldiers were killed, including Golomb, and the Palestinians managed to snatch three of the bodies and drag them into a nearby house. A rescue force of Shayetet 13 naval commandos under Colonel Ram Rothberg was quickly assembled. Mofaz told Rothberg that negotiation over the bodies might force the IDF to halt the operation and get it in trouble similar to the 2000 Hezbollah cross-border raid. On the edge of the alley leading to "the bathtub", Rothberg questioned the wounded reservists. Finally, the commando force entered the house where the bodies were being held, killed the Palestinian militants in close-range combat, and extracted the bodies. In the afternoon, all Israeli casualties were evacuated from the area. A few hours after the ambush, a Golani Brigade soldier was killed at the edge of the refugee camp. With the loss of fourteen soldiers, it became the deadliest day for the IDF since the end of the 1982 Lebanon War.

During that day, the IDF censored reports on the events, leading to a wave of rumors. Partial information leaked through phone calls made by reservists and internet sites. By evening, when Chief of Central Command, Brigadier General Yitzhak Eitan, had a press conference, there were rumors of a helicopter carrying dozens of troops shot down, the death of the Ramatkal's deputy, and a heart attack suffered by the Minister of Defense.

After the ambush, all Israeli forces began to advance by Buchris' tactics, utilizing armored bulldozers and Achzarit APCs in their push. Israeli forces also relied heavily on increased missile strikes from helicopters. Several officers demanded that F-16 jets be sent to bomb the camp, but the IDF High Command refused. The dozen bulldozers and APCs pushed deep into the heart of the camp, flattening a built-up area of 200 square yards, destroying militant strongpoints.

As the Palestinian fighters' resistance faltered against the sheer force of the Israeli assault and their supplies of food and ammunition dwindled, Israeli troops mopped up the final resistance. At 7:00 AM on April 11, the Palestinians began to surrender. Qabha refused to surrender and was killed, being among the last to die. Most of the Palestinian fighters were either killed or captured. Some managed to escape the city and slip through the ring of Israeli troops and tanks around it. Among them was Zakaria Zubeidi who moved through the houses and left. Mardawi surrendered along with Ali Suleiman al-Saadi, known as "Safouri", and thirty-nine others. He later said that "There was nothing I could do against that bulldozer".

== Battle aftermath ==
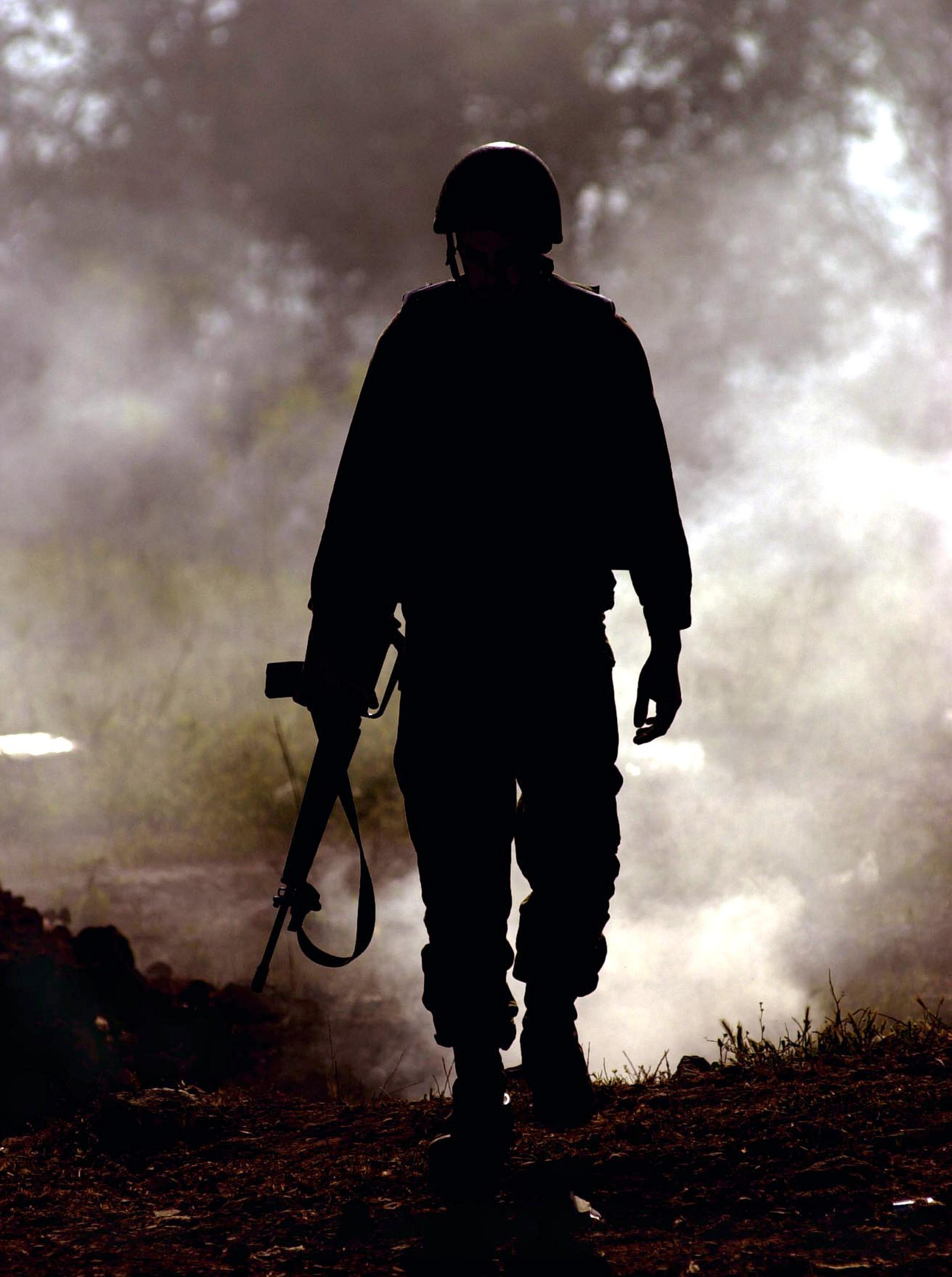
An Israeli soldier at the end of the battle on the eve of the IDF's withdrawal from Jenin

Aerial photograph of the area demolished in the Jenin camp's central Hawashin district.

The battle ended on April 11. Medical teams from Canada, France, and Italy, as well as UN and ICRC officials, with trucks carrying supplies and water waited outside the camp for clearance to enter for days, but were denied entry, with Israel citing ongoing military operations. The first independent observers were granted access to the camp on April 16. Israeli troops began withdrawing from the camp itself on April 18. Tanks ringed the perimeter of the camp for a few more days, but by April 24, Israeli troops had withdrawn from the autonomous zone of Jenin.

=== Removal of bodies ===
The IDF announced that it would not withdraw its troops from the Jenin camp until it had collected the bodies of the Palestinian dead. The army would not confirm Palestinian reports that military trucks had removed dozens of bodies, nor would it comment on whether or not burials had taken place.

According to Haaretz, some of the bodies had already been removed from the camp by soldiers to a site near Jenin on April 11, but had not yet been buried. Palestinians allegedly buried others during the battle in a mass grave near the hospital on the outskirts of the camp. On the evening of April 11, Israeli television showed footage of refrigerator trucks waiting outside the camp to transfer bodies to "terrorist cemeteries". On April 12, Haaretz reported that

"The IDF intends to bury today Palestinians killed in the West Bank camp ... The sources said two infantry companies, along with members of the military rabbinate, will enter the camp today to collect bodies. Those who can be identified as civilians will be moved to a hospital in Jenin, and then on to burial, while those identified as terrorists will be buried at a special cemetery in the Jordan Valley."

The same day, in response to a petition presented by the Adalah organization, the Israeli High Court ordered the IDF to stop removing the bodies of Palestinians killed in battle until after a hearing on the matter. MK Ahmed Tibi, one of many signatories to the petition before the court, said that removing the bodies from the city violated international law and was "intended to hide the truth from the public about the killing that occurred there". Following the court's decision, issued by Supreme Court President Aharon Barak, the IDF stopped clearing the bodies from the camp. It was reported that by the afternoon of April 13, the IDF had determined the location of 23 bodies in the camp which were marked on maps. On April 14, the Supreme Court reversed its decision, and ruled that the IDF could remove the bodies. IDF Chief of Staff Shaul Mofaz confirmed to Israeli media on April 14 that the army intended to bury the bodies in the special cemetery.

On April 15 humanitarian aid organizations were granted access to the camp for the first time since the invasion had begun. Palestinian Red Crescent Society and International Committee of the Red Cross staff entered the camp, accompanied by the IDF. Officials from the Red Crescent told lawyer Hassan Jabareen that the IDF did not allow them to move around the camps freely, and that advanced decomposition, as well as the enormous destruction in the camp, made it impossible to find and retrieve bodies without the proper equipment. That same day Adalah and LAW, the Palestinian Society for the Protection of Human Rights and the Environment, filed a petition asking the Court to order the IDF to immediately hand over the bodies of Palestinians to the Red Cross or the Red Crescent, saying that the bodies of dead Palestinians were being left to rot in the camp. On April 19, a day after Israeli troops withdrew from the camp, journalists reported counting about 23 bodies that were lined up on the outdoor grounds of the clinic, before being quickly buried by Palestinians.

Tanya Reinhart notes that later Israeli media reports attempted to conceal and reinterpret their intention to transfer the bodies to the special cemetery in the Jordan Valley. As an example, she cites a July 17, 2002 article by Ze'ev Schiff in Haaretz which provided a wholly different explanation for the presence of the refrigerator trucks posted outside the city on April 11. Schiff's article said: "Toward the end of the fighting, the army sent three large refrigerator trucks into the city. Reservists decided to sleep in them for their air-conditioning. Some Palestinians saw dozens of covered bodies lying in the trucks and rumors spread that the Jews had filled the trucks full of Palestinian bodies."

== Invasion aftermath ==
=== Military analyses ===
The Israelis said they found explosive-making labs and factories for assembling Qassam II rockets. One Israeli special forces commander who fought in the camp said that "the Palestinians were admirably well prepared. They correctly analyzed the lessons of the previous raid". Mardawi told CNN from prison in Israel, that after learning the IDF was going to use troops, and not planes, "It was like hunting ... like being given a prize. ... The Israelis knew that any soldier who went into the camp like that was going to get killed. ... I've been waiting for a moment like that for years".

General Dan Harel, Head of the IDF Operations Directorate, said "There were indications it was going to be hard, but we didn't think it was going to be so hard". An internal investigation published by the IDF six months after the battle implicitly cast the responsibility for the death of the thirteen soldiers on the soldiers themselves, for straying from their path unreported. It also said that the focusing on the rescue instead of subduing the enemy complicated things. Buchris was given the Chief of Staff citation.

PLO Chairman Yasser Arafat, who left the compound in Ramallah for the first time in five months on May 14, 2002 to visit Jenin and other West Bank cities affected in Operation Defensive Shield, praised the refugees' endurance and compared the fighting to the Battle of Stalingrad. Addressing a gathering of about 200 people in Jenin, he said: "People of Jenin, all the citizens of Jenin and the refugee camp, this is Jenin-grad. Your battle has paved the way to the liberation of the occupied territories". The battle became known among the Palestinians as "Jeningrad".

The battle attracted the interest of the US military, which was trying to build a doctrine for urban warfare as the 2003 invasion of Iraq loomed. US military observers were sent to study the fighting. US officers dressed in IDF uniforms were reportedly present during the final stages of the battle. The United States Marine Corps Warfighting Laboratory studied the battle, and a Joint Chiefs of Staff delegation was sent to Israel to make changes to US Marine Corps doctrine based on the battle.

=== Damages ===
The BBC reported that ten percent of the camp was "virtually rubbed out by a dozen armoured Israeli bulldozers." David Holley, a Major in the British Territorial Army and a military adviser to Amnesty International, reported that an area within the refugee camp of about 100 m by 200 m was flattened. According to Stephen Graham, the IDF had systematically bulldozed an area measuring 160 by 250 m in the Jenin refugee camp. The Hawashin neighbourhood was levelled. Many residents had no advance warning, and some were buried alive.

Human Rights Watch (HRW) and Amnesty International (AI) reported that an estimated 4,000 people, more than a quarter of the population of the camp, were rendered homeless because of this destruction. HRW listed 140 buildings, most of which housed multiple families, as completely destroyed, and 200 other buildings as sustaining damage rendering them uninhabitable or unsafe for use. AI said complete destruction affected 164 houses with 374 apartment units, and that other buildings had been partially destroyed. Israel said those numbers were exaggerations.

On May 31, 2002, the Israeli newspaper Yediot Aharonot published an interview with Moshe Nissim, nicknamed "Kurdi Bear", a D-9 operator who took part in the battle. Nissim said he had driven his D-9 for seventy-five hours straight, drinking whiskey to avoid fatigue, and that apart from a two-hour training course before the battle, he had no prior experience in driving a bulldozer. He said he had begged his officers to let him destroy more houses and added:
"I didn't see, with my own eyes, people dying under the blade of the D-9 and I didn't see house[s] falling down on live people. But if there were any, I wouldn't care at all ...
"But the real thing started the day 13 of our soldiers were killed up that alley in the Jenin refugee camp.
"If we had moved into the building where they were ambushed, we would have buried all those Palestinians alive.
"I kept thinking of our soldiers. I didn't feel sorry for all those Palestinians who were left homeless. I just felt sorry for their children, who were not guilty. There was one wounded child, who was shot by Arabs. A Golani paramedic came down and changed his bandages, till he was evacuated. We took care of them, of the children. The soldiers gave them candy. But I had no mercy for the parents of these children. I remembered the picture on television, of the mother who said she will bear children so that they will explode in Tel Aviv. I asked the Palestinian women I saw there: 'Aren't you ashamed?'"

=== Casualties ===
Reporting of casualty numbers during the invasion varied widely and fluctuated day to day. On April 10, the BBC reported that Israel estimated 150 Palestinians had died in Jenin, and Palestinians were saying the number was far higher. That same day, Saeb Erekat, on a phone interview to CNN from Jericho, estimated that there were a total of 500 Palestinians killed during Operation Defensive Shield, this figure also including fatalities outside of the Jenin camp, in other areas of the West Bank. On April 11, Ben Wedeman of CNN reported that Palestinians were reporting 500 dead, while international relief agencies were saying possibly as many as 200; he noted that his efforts to independently verify the claims had so far come to naught since people were being prevented from entering the camp by Israeli soldiers.

On April 12, Brigadier-General Ron Kitri said on Army Radio that there were apparently hundreds of Palestinians killed in Jenin. He later retracted this statement. Secretary-General of the Palestinian Authority, Ahmed Abdel Rahman, said that thousands of Palestinians had been killed and buried in mass graves, or lay under houses destroyed in Jenin and Nablus. On April 13, Palestinian Information Minister, Yasser Abed Rabbo, accused Israel of killing 900 Palestinians in the camp and burying them in mass graves. On April 14, Haaretz reported that the exact number of Palestinian dead was still unknown, but that the IDF placed the toll between 100 and 200. On April 18, Zalman Shoval, adviser to Sharon, said that only about 65 bodies had been recovered, five of them civilians. On April 30, Qadoura Mousa, director of the Fatah for the northern West Bank, said the number of dead was 56.

Based on figures provided by the Jenin hospital and the IDF, the UN report placed the Palestinian death toll at 52 Palestinian, around half of whom were thought to be civilians. In 2004, Haaretz journalists Amos Harel and Avi Isacharoff wrote that 23 Israeli soldiers had died and 52 had been wounded; Palestinian casualties were 53 dead, hundreds wounded and about 200 captured. Human Rights Watch reported that at least 52 Palestinians died of whom at least 22 were civilians and at least 27 were suspected militants, and that it was unable to conclusively determine the status of the remaining three. According to retired IDF General Shlomo Gazit, the death toll was 55 Palestinians. Israeli officials estimated that 52 Palestinians were killed: 38 armed men and 14 civilians.

IDF and Israeli government sources reported that 23 Israeli soldiers were killed and 75 wounded. The UN report also noted that 23 IDF soldiers had been killed. The only exception was retired IDF General Shlomo Gazit, who initially said that 33 soldiers had died in Jenin. This contradicted not only most IDF and other sources, but also IDF figures of 30 Israeli deaths total in Operation Defensive Shield.

=== Massacre allegations ===
The battle attracted widespread international attention due to allegations by Palestinians that a massacre had been committed. Reporters from various international media outlets quoted local residents who described houses being bulldozed with families still inside, helicopters firing indiscriminately into civilian areas, ambulances being prevented from reaching the wounded, summary executions of Palestinians, and stories of bodies being driven away in trucks or left in the sewers and bulldozed. Saeb Erekat, a Palestinian cabinet minister, accused the Israelis of trying to cover up the killing of civilians. The CNN correspondent noted that due to the IDF closure of the camp, there was "no way of confirming" the stories. During and immediately after the battle, the United Nations and several human rights NGOs also expressed concern about the possibility of a massacre. A British forensic expert who was part of an Amnesty International team granted access to Jenin on April 18 said, "the evidence before us at the moment doesn't lead us to believe that the allegations are anything other than truthful and that therefore there are large numbers of civilian dead underneath these bulldozed and bombed ruins that we see."

Israel denied charges of a massacre, and a lone April 9 report in the Israeli press stating Foreign Minister Shimon Peres privately referred to the battle as a "massacre" was immediately followed by a statement from Peres expressing concern that "Palestinian propaganda is liable to accuse Israel that a 'massacre' took place in Jenin rather than a pitched battle against heavily armed terrorists."

Subsequent investigations and reports by the United Nations, Amnesty International, Human Rights Watch, Time magazine, and the BBC all concluded there was no massacre of civilians, with estimated death tolls of 46–55 people among reports by the IDF, the Jenin office of the United Nations, and the Jenin Hospital. A team of four Palestinian-appointed investigators reporting to Fatah numbered total casualties of 56, as disclosed by Kadoura Mousa Kadoura, the director of Yasser Arafat's Fatah movement for the northern West Bank.

The UN report to the Secretary General noted "Palestinians had claimed that between 400 and 500 people had been killed, fighters and civilians together. They had also claimed a number of summary executions and the transfer of corpses to an unknown place outside the city of Jenin. The number of Palestinian fatalities, on the basis of bodies recovered to date, in Jenin and the refugee camp in this military operation can be estimated at around 55." While noting the number of civilian deaths might rise as rubble was cleared, the report continued, "nevertheless, the most recent estimates by UNRWA and ICRC show that the number of missing people is constantly declining as the IDF releases Palestinians from detention." Human Rights Watch completed its report on Jenin in early May, stating "there was no massacre," but accusing the IDF of war crimes, and Amnesty International's report concluded "No matter whose figures one accepts, "there was no massacre." Amnesty's report specifically observed that "after the IDF temporarily withdrew from Jenin refugee camp on April 17, UNRWA set up teams to use the census lists to account for all the Palestinians (some 14,000) believed to be resident of the camp on April 3, 2002. Within five weeks all but one of the residents was accounted for." A BBC report later noted, "Palestinian authorities made unsubstantiated claims of a wide-scale massacre," and a reporter for The Observer opined that what happened in Jenin was not a massacre.

=== War crimes allegations ===
At the same time, human rights organizations and some media reports charged Israel with war crimes. Human Rights Watch reported that of the Palestinians killed, "many of them were killed willfully or unlawfully, and in some cases constituted war crimes." Examples included the case of 57-year-old Kamal Zugheir who was shot and then run over by IDF tanks while in his wheelchair, and that of 37-year-old Jamal Fayid, a quadraplegic crushed to death in the rubble of his home after an IDF bulldozer advanced upon it, refusing to allow his family to intervene to remove him. It also documented the killing of a Palestinian militant who had already been wounded. In November, Amnesty International reported that there was "clear evidence" that the IDF committed war crimes against Palestinian civilians, including unlawful killings and torture, in Jenin and Nablus. The report also accused Israel of blocking medical care, using people as human shields and bulldozing houses with residents inside, as well as beating prisoners, which resulted in one death, and preventing ambulances and aid organizations from reaching the areas of combat even after the fighting had reportedly been stopped. Amnesty criticized the UN report, noting that its officials did not actually visit Jenin. The Observer reporter, Peter Beaumont, wrote that what happened in Jenin was not a massacre, but that the mass destruction of houses was a war crime. Some reports said that Israel's restriction of access to Jenin and refusal to allow the UN investigation access to the area were evidence of a coverup, a charge echoed by Mouin Rabbani, Director of the Palestinian American Research Center in Ramallah.

On the other side, Israeli media sources and analysts suggested media bias and propaganda efforts were the source of the allegations. Haaretz editor Hanoch Marmari stated, "some correspondents might have been obsessive in their determination to unearth a massacre in a refugee camp". Mohammed Dajani of Al-Quds University said that the Palestinian Authority wanted "to turn Jenin into an 'Alamo episode'. Here the press was a willing partner [as] they aspired to make Jenin a symbol of resistance to Palestinians". In May 2009, the IDF released a videotape showing what it called "a phony funeral that the Palestinians organized in order to multiply the number of casualties in Jenin," wherein a live person is wrapped in a green sheet and marched in a procession. LAW, the Palestinian Society for the Protection of Human Rights, held a press conference on May 8, disputing the conclusions drawn by Israel. LAW stated that Mohammad Bakri who was in Jenin on April 28, making his documentary film Jenin, Jenin, shot the same footage from the ground, and that it shows a group of children playing "funeral" near the cemetery. LAW added that, "The media uncritically took up the Israeli spokesmen conclusions, without investigating what the footage actually shows."

Harel and Issacharoff wrote that the IDF's misconduct with the media, including Kitri's statement, contributed to the allegations of massacre. Mofaz later admitted that the limitations imposed on the media were a mistake. Head of the Operations Directorate, General Dan Harel, said: "Today, I would send a reporter in every APC". IDF Spokeswoman, Miri Eisin, said the decision not to allow reporters into the camp was a difficult one: "The press people said 'Listen, the journalists aren't going to like it' and the operational people said 'We don't care about the journalists right now and about our image, we don't want them inside.' It had to do with the way we were working operationally inside the camp. We had infantry coming in from 360 degrees which means that you're firing in all different directions. It's not like a journalist can be [safe] on one side or another. It's a very difficult type of combat to coordinate with the forces, let alone with somebody you don't know who's inside."

In Pierre Rehov's documentary The Road to Jenin, a Palestinian doctor claimed that on the second day, the city's hospital was hit by eleven tank shells. However, in both Rehov's film and Richard Landes's 2005 film Pallywood, the supposed hits shown on Jenin hospital were compared to an actual building hit by Merkava tank shelling, suggesting that the supposed hit marks were staged.

Lorenzo Cremonesi, the correspondent for the Italian newspaper Corriere della Sera in Jerusalem, writes in a 2009 article, that he slipped past the army barricades and entered the Jenin camp on April 13, 2002. He says the hospital was almost deserted as doctors played cards in the emergency room and that he spoke to 25 lightly wounded patients who told heartrending stories but when asked for names of the dead and urged to show where the bodies were, became evasive. "In short, it was all talk and nothing could be verified," wrote Cremonesi. "At the end of that day, I wrote that the death toll was not more than 50 and most of them were combatants". Cremonesi criticized Israel's exclusion of the media from Jenin and from Gaza during the 2009 war, saying, "If you hide something from me, that means first and foremost that you want to hide it, and secondly, that you have done something wrong."

=== UN fact-finding mission ===
On April 18, as Israeli troops began pulling out of Jenin and Nablus, UN envoy Terje Roed-Larsen entered the camp. He told reporters that the devastation was, "horrific beyond belief," and relayed his view that it was "morally repugnant" that Israel had not allowed emergency workers into the camp after the battle with Palestinian gunmen had ended. On April 19, the United Nations Security Council unanimously passed Resolution 1405 to send a fact-finding mission to Jenin. Israeli Foreign Minister Shimon Peres told Kofi Annan, the UN Secretary-General, that Israel would welcome a UN official "to clarify the facts", saying "Israel has nothing to hide regarding the operation in Jenin. Our hands are clean". Abed Rabbo said the mission was, "the first step toward making Sharon stand trial before an international tribunal".

The composition of the fact-finding team was announced on April 22. Led by former Finnish President, Martti Ahtisaari, the other two members were Cornelio Sommaruga, former president of the International Committee of the Red Cross (controversial in Israel for previous "Red Swastika" remarks), and Sadako Ogata, the former UN high commissioner for refugees who was Japan's special envoy on Afghan reconstruction.

Official Israeli sources expressed surprise that they were not consulted as to the composition of the team, adding that, "We expected that the operational aspects of the fact-finding mission would be carried out by military experts." On April 22, Israeli Defense Minister, Benjamin Ben-Eliezer expressed his disappointment at the team's make-up, and his hope that the mission would not overstep its mandate. Peres asked Annan to deny reports that the mission would look into events outside the refugee camp, and that the findings would have legal validity. Annan said the findings would not be legally binding, and that the mission would only investigate events inside the camp, but may have to interview residents currently displaced outside.

On April 23, Gideon Saar, the cabinet secretary, threatened to ban the team from entering Jenin. In private discussions, Giora Eiland, Major General and Head of the IDF Operation Branch, convinced Shaul Mofaz that the team would ask to investigate officers and soldiers, and that it might accuse Israel of war crimes, paving the way for the sending of an international force. Sharon accepted Eiland and Mofaz's position, and announced Israel's decision that the UN team was no longer acceptable on April 24, citing the lack of military experts. The US rebuked Sharon's decision, and a White House official said, "We were the sponsors of that and we want it implemented as written. We support the initiative of the secretary general."

Annan initially refused to delay the mission. Expressing Israeli sentiment that the world ignored its victims, Ben-Eliezer said: "In the last month alone, 137 people were slaughtered by Palestinians and nearly 700 wounded. Is there any one who is investigating that?" Saeb Erekat accused Israel of "trying to sabotage the mission. I believe that they have a big thing to hide." On April 25, the UN agreed to postpone the arrival of the team by two days, and acceded to an Israeli request that two military officers be added to the team. Annan said talks with Israel had been, "very, very constructive and I'm sure we'll be able to sort out our differences". Peres said that a delay would give the Israeli cabinet the opportunity to discuss the mission before the team arrived.

Avi Pazner, an Israeli Government spokesman, said he expected the UN mission to investigate "terrorist activity" and guarantee immunity for Israeli soldiers. Israel Radio reported that Israel was also pushing for the right for both sides to review the team's report before its presentation to Annan. Following a lengthy cabinet meeting on April 28, Reuven Rivlin, the Israeli Communications Minister, told reporters that the UN had reneged on its agreements with Israel over the team, and so it would not be allowed to arrive. Speaking for the cabinet, he said that the composition of the team and its terms of reference made it inevitable that its report would blame Israel.

The UN Security Council convened the following day to discuss Israel's decision not to grant entry to the UN team. Meanwhile, the American Israel Public Affairs Committee lobby in Washington was called to pressure Annan and George W. Bush. On April 30, Annan urged that the UN team, which had been waiting in Geneva to start its mission, be disbanded, and it was on May 2. On May 4, Israel was isolated in an open debate in the Security Council. The deputy US ambassador to the UN, James Cunningham, said it was "regrettable" Israel had decided not to cooperate with the fact-finding team. Nasser Al-Kidwa, the Palestinian observer to the UN, said the council failed to give Annan its full support, and had caved to "blackmailing" by the Israeli Government. The General Assembly passed a resolution condemning Israel's military action in Jenin by 74 votes to four, with 54 abstentions. The Bush administration supported Israel as part of a deal in which Sharon agreed to lift the siege of the Mukataa in Ramallah.

=== Reconstruction ===
In the aftermath of the invasion, many camp residents ended up living in temporary shelters elsewhere. The camp itself became the site of intense efforts at documenting, recording and expressing the experiences of those displaced and affected by the incursion. In discussing how to properly honor those who had fallen, one proposal suggested leaving the destruction, at least in the Hawashin neighborhood, exactly as it was, as a memorial and testament to struggle and sacrifice. Camp residents, however, insisted that the camp be rebuilt almost exactly as it had been, while also establishing a museum of memory in the Old Hijaz Railway building. They rejected the proposal of the Israeli housing minister to rebuild the camp at a nearby site with enlarged roads, viewing it as an attempt to erase the political reality of the camps whose existence they see as living testaments to the 1948 Palestinian expulsion and flight.

== See also ==
- Jenin, a song by singer/songwriter David Rovics
- Jenin, Jenin

== Bibliography ==
- Europa Regional Surveys of the World 2004 Series (2004). The Middle East and North Africa 2004 (50th, illustrated ed.). Routledge. ISBN 978-1-85743-184-1.
- Graham, Stephen (2004). Cities, war, and terrorism: towards an urban geopolitics (22nd, illustrated ed.). Wiley-Blackwell. ISBN 978-1-4051-1575-9.
- Harel, Amos; Avi Isacharoff (2004). The Seventh War (in Hebrew). Tel-Aviv: Yedioth Aharonoth Books and Chemed Books. p. 431. ISBN 965-511-767-7.
- Herzog, Chaim; Shlomo Gazit (2005). The Arab-Israeli Wars: War and Peace in the Middle East. Vintage. p. 560. ISBN 1-4000-7963-2.
- Gresh, Alain; Vidal, Dominique (2004). The new A-Z of the Middle East (2nd, illustrated ed.). I.B. Tauris. ISBN 978-1-86064-326-2.
- Human Rights Watch (2003). Human Rights Watch World Report, 2003 (Revised ed.). Human Rights Watch. ISBN 978-1-56432-285-2.
- Karsh, Efraim (October 26, 2004). Arafat's War: The Man and His Battle for Israeli Conquest. Grove Press. ISBN 0-8021-4158-7.
- Gutmann, Stephanie (2005). The Other War: Israelis, Palestinians and the Struggle for Media Supremacy. Encounter Books. ISBN 1-893554-94-5.
- MacDonald, Théodore Harney (2007). The global human right to health: dream or possibility?. Radcliffe Publishing. ISBN 978-1-84619-201-2.
- McDonald, Avril; Fischer, H. (2005). Yearbook of International Humanitarian Law, Volume 5. Cambridge University Press. ISBN 978-90-6704-189-8.
- Reinhart, Tanya (2006). The road map to nowhere: Israel/Palestine since 2003 (Illustrated ed.). Verso. ISBN 978-1-84467-076-5.
- Sa'di, Ahmad H.; Abu-Lughod, Lila (2007). Nakba: Palestine, 1948, and the claims of memory (Illustrated ed.). Columbia University Press. ISBN 978-0-231-13579-5.
- Selby, Jan (2003). Water, power and politics in the Middle East: the other Israeli-Palestinian conflict (Illustrated ed.). I.B. Tauris. ISBN 978-1-86064-934-9.
- Winslow, Philip C. (September 1, 2008). Victory for Us Is to See You Suffer: In the West Bank with the Palestinians and the Israelis. Beacon Press. ISBN 978-0-8070-6907-3.

=== Further reading ===
- Goldberg, Brett (2003). A Psalm in Jenin. Israel: Modan Publishing House. p. 304. ISBN 965-7141-03-6.
- Baroud, Ramzy Mohammed, ed. (2003). Searching Jenin: Eyewitness Accounts of the Israeli Invasion 2002. Seattle, Washington: Cune Press. p. 256. ISBN 1-885942-34-6.
