= Lugassi =

Lugassi (also spelled "Lugasi", "Lugassy", "Lugacy" or in some cases "Lugashi") is a Sephardic Jewish surname which originated in the Asturian town of Llugás. Jews mostly began to carry this name after the 1492 expulsion.

Notable people with the name include:

- Oshri Lugasi, Chief Combat Engineering Corps Officer of the IDF
- Daniella Lugassy, Israeli soprano opera singer
- Talia Lugacy, American film director, writer, producer, and a Screen Studies assistant professor.
- Gary Lugassy, French Tennis player
- Moti Lugasi, Israeli taekwando fighter
- Moshe Lugasi, Israeli footballer
- Moses Lugassy, 19th Century Moroccan born British businessman and Zionist activist
