= Oshri =

Oshri is a given name. Notable people with the name include:

- Oshri Cohen, Israeli actor
- Oshri Gita, Israeli football player
- Oshri Levi, Israeli football player
- Oshri Lugasi, Israeli army officer
- Oshri Roash, Israeli footballer
