= Mahmoud Tawalbe =

Palestinian fighter and militant

- محمود طوالبة
- Born: March 19, 1979; Jenin, West Bank
- Died: April 20, 2002 (aged 23); Jenin, West Bank

Mahmoud Tawalbe (Arabic: محمود طوالبة; c. 1979 – 2002), also known as Nusri, was the head of the Palestinian Islamic Jihad in Jenin, one of the main strongholds of the militant organization.

Tawalbe was involved in many attacks against Israelis but he was best known for being the leader of the Palestinian militants in Jenin during the Battle of Jenin, part of Israel's 2002 Operation Defensive Shield.

The Israeli authorities had 23-year-old Mahmoud Tawalbe, a father of two who worked in a record store but also headed the local Palestinian Islamic Jihad cell, at the top of their "wanted" list. Tawalbe was responsible for numerous attacks against Israelis, including an October 2001 shooting on the main street of Hadera, north of Tel Aviv, which killed four women. Tawalbe had dispatched his 19-year-old brother Murad on a suicide attack to Haifa in the July of that year, though Murad lost his nerve and surrendered to Israel Police. Other top Islamic Jihad targets in Jenin included Thabet Mardawi, behind a March 20 suicide bomb that killed seven Israelis on a bus, and Ali Suleiman al-Saadi, known as Safouri, who had planned a November shooting that killed two Israelis.

Tawalbe was one of the commanders in the battle over Jenin. Tawalbe ordered supporters to booby trap the entire camp in order to kill as many Israeli soldiers as possible.

During a break from the fighting on the seventh day, Tawalbe sneaked out of the camp into neighbouring Jenin to visit his mother and brother. His brother told Time that "Mahmoud looked pleased with his work", and he told his mother "Don't worry about me...I feel strong". The camp lore says Mahmoud killed 13 Israelis in the fighting.

Time visited the rubble of the house where Tawalbe died with a British military expert working in the camp for Amnesty International, David Holley. They reported that "the three-story structure shows signs of attack from two directions. One wall was charred by fire; the wall on the other side had collapsed." Holley deduced from the tank tracks and bomb craters that Tawalbe was killed by an alert IDF Caterpillar D9 armored bulldozer whose operator thwarted an attempt by Tawalbe and his gunmen to plant a bomb on the armour of a passing Israeli Armored fighting vehicle, probably by ramming the wall onto him.

After the battle of Jenin, Mahmoud Tawalbe was considered a hero by many Palestinians and Arabs worldwide. His mangled corpse was interred together with that of his fellow militant due to the difficulty in identifying the bodies, in Jenin's "Martyrs' Cemetery". Tawalbe was labeled "general of the martyrs" in posters throughout the camp, and marching children chanted his name.
