= IDF Caterpillar D9 =

Israel Defense Forces armored bulldozer

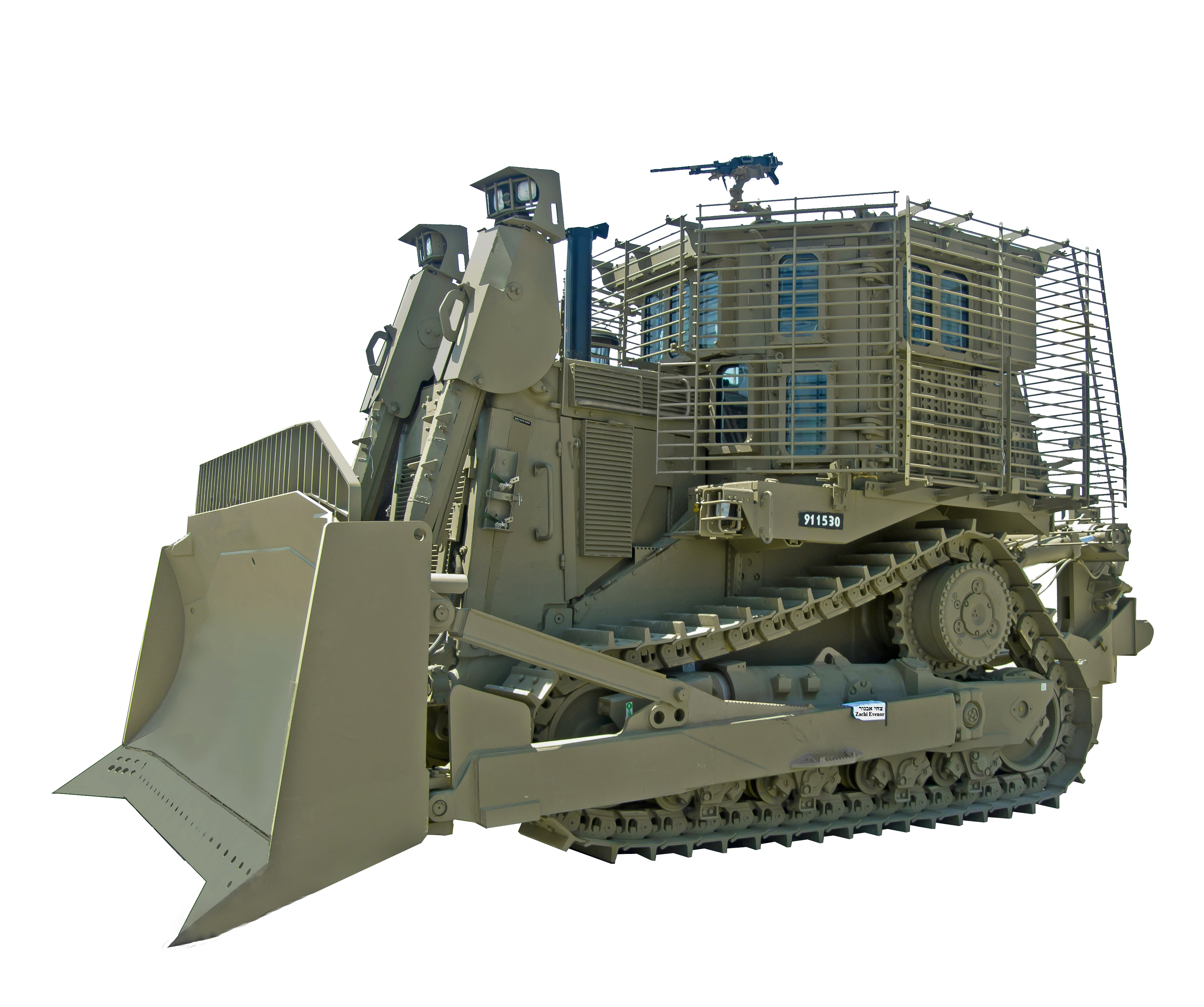
An Israeli armored Caterpillar D9R bulldozer. Its armor allows it to work under heavy fire.

The IDF Caterpillar D9 — nicknamed Doobi (Hebrew: דובי, for teddy bear) — is a Caterpillar D9 armored bulldozer used by the Israel Defense Forces (IDF). It is supplied by Caterpillar Inc. and modified by the Israel Defense Forces, Israeli Military Industries and Israel Aerospace Industries to increase the survivability of the bulldozer in hostile environments and enable it to withstand attack.

In the 1980s the IDF began modifying D9 bulldozers to incorporate armour. The bulldozers can also be fitted with weaponry such as machine guns and grenade launchers. There are various models, including a remote controlled version.

Over the course of numerous campaigns, IDF bulldozers have been used to demolish thousands of Palestinian homes in Gaza, leaving tens of thousands of people homeless. The Office of the UN High Commissioner on Human Rights has advised Caterpillar Inc. that by supplying the bulldozers to the IDF it may be complicit in human rights violations.

The IDF Caterpillar D9 is operated by the Israel Defense Forces (IDF) Combat Engineering Corps essentially for combat engineering operations. It has been involved in incidents of civilian deaths, including the 2003 killing of activist Rachel Corrie and civilians sheltering outside the Kamal Adwan Hospital reported in 2023 and 2024 during the Gaza war.

== Characteristics ==
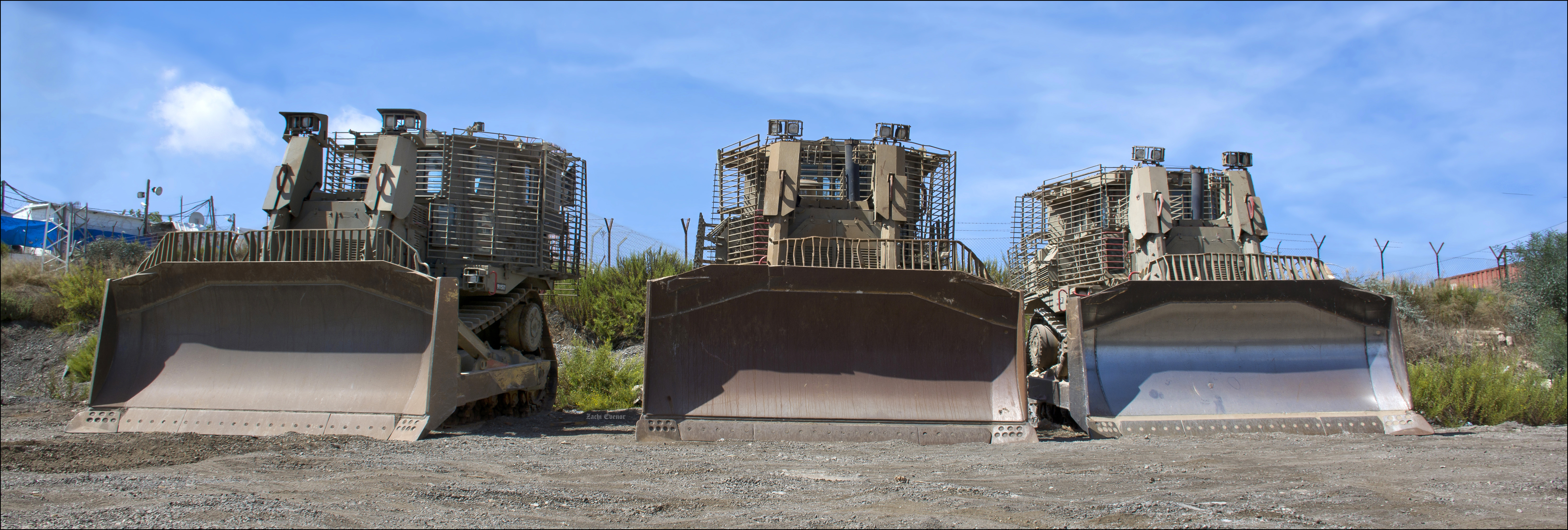
Three IDF Caterpillar D9 armored bulldozers with slat armor parked near an IDF outpost

The D9R, the latest generation of Caterpillar D9 bulldozers in IDF service, has a power of 405–410 horsepower (302–306 kW) and drawbar pull of 71.6 metric tons (about 702 kN). Older generations, such as D9L and D9N are still in service, mainly in the reserve forces. The D9 has a crew of two: operator and commander. It is operated by the TZAMA (In Hebrew: צמ"ה = ציוד מכני הנדסי, mechanical engineering equipment) units of the Combat Engineering Corps.

In some cases the bulldozers have been fitted with machine guns and grenade launchers.

The IDF uses the D9 for a wide variety of combat engineering tasks, such as earthworks, digging moats, mounting sand barriers, building fortifications, rescuing stuck, overturned or damaged armored fighting vehicles (along with the M88 Recovery Vehicle), clearing land mines, detonating IEDs and explosives, handling booby traps, clearing terrain obstacles and opening routes to armored fighting vehicles and infantry, as well as structures demolition, including under fire.

== History ==
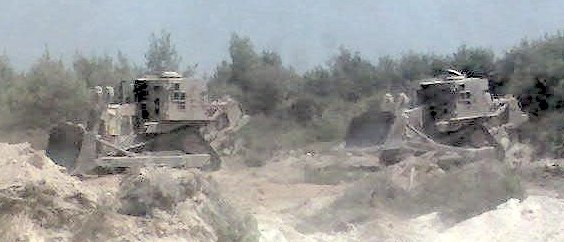
IDF D9N (2nd generation armor) demolishing Hezbollah's bunkers during the Second Lebanon War

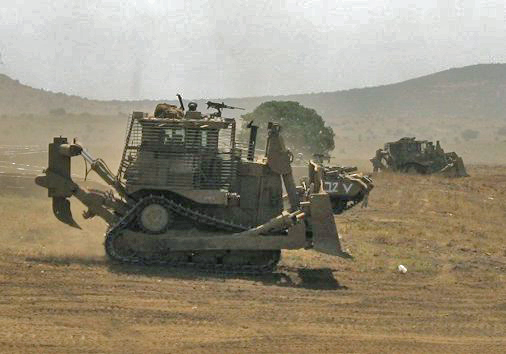
IDF D9R (3.5th generation armor) armed with FN Mag machinegun and slat armor during IDF training

Caterpillar Inc. introduced the Caterpillar D9 bulldozer in 1954 and it quickly found its way to civilian engineering in Israel and from there it was recruited to military service by the Israel Defense Forces (IDF).

=== Earlier use ===
Unarmored D9 bulldozers were used in the Sinai War (1956), Six-Day War (1967), Yom Kippur War (1973) and the 1982 Lebanon War (1982).

During the 1982 Lebanon War D9s were employed in breaching and paving ways through mountains and fields in the mountain landscape of southern Lebanon. The D9s also cleared minefields and explosive belly charges set on the main routes by Syrian army and Palestinian insurgents. Because the D9 served as front-line tools, the IDF developed armor kits to protect the lives of the soldiers operating them.

=== The Second Intifada ===
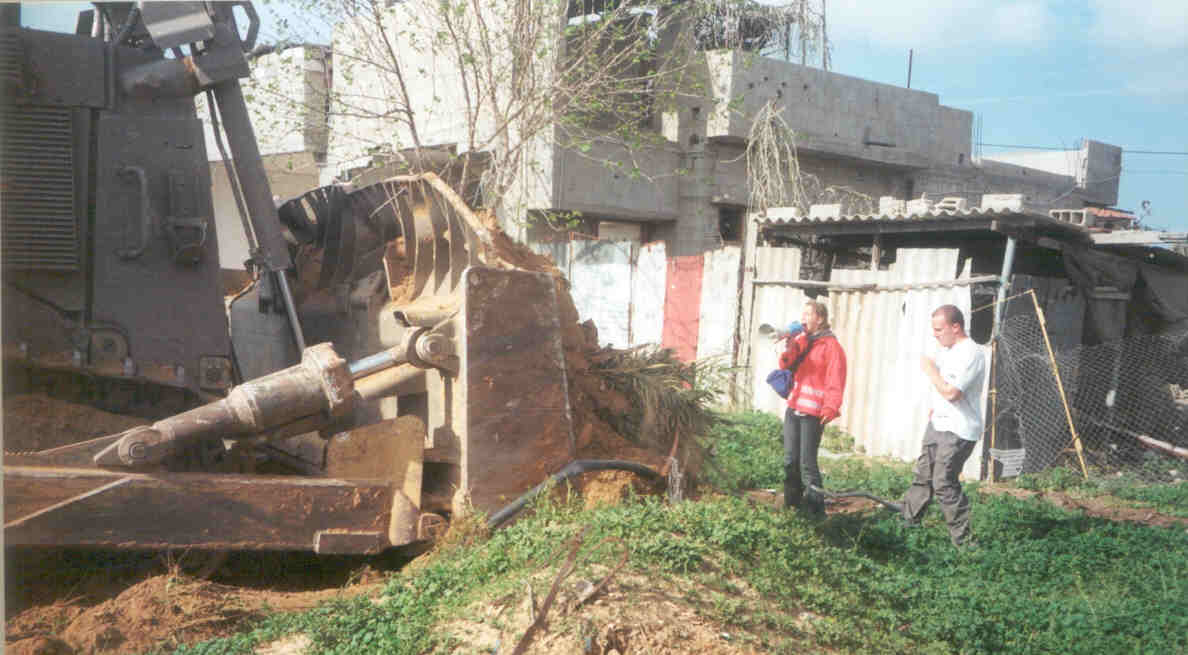
American peace activist Rachel Corrie opposing the demolition of Palestinian homes by Israeli military bulldozers, hours before they crushed her, on March 16, 2003.

Armored D9 bulldozers were used during the Second Intifada (2000–2005), a Palestinian uprising against Israeli occupation. Over 3,000 homes in Palestine were demolished by Israel during the conflict, leaving tens of thousands of people homeless. The destruction of Palestinian homes promoted protests. In one such protest in Rafah in 2003 a group of eight people tried to stop a D9 bulldozer from demolishing a family home. The operator of the bulldozer drove over one of the protesters, Rachel Corrie. She died as a result of her injuries.

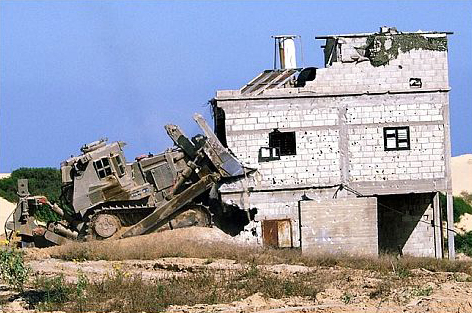
An IDF D9N (2nd generation armor) razing a house in Gaza during the Second Intifada

Following several incidents where armed Palestinians barricaded themselves inside houses and killed soldiers attempting to breach the entries, the IDF developed "pressure cooker procedure" in which D9s and other engineering vehicles were used to bring them out by razing the houses; most of them surrendered because of fear of being buried alive.

During the 2002 Battle of Jenin armored D9 bulldozers cleared booby traps and improvised explosive devices, and eventually razed houses from which militants fired upon Israeli soldiers or contained possible IEDs and booby traps. After the deadly ambush in which 13 soldiers were killed, D9 bulldozers razed the center of the Jenin refugee camp and forced the remaining Palestinian fighters to surrender, thus finishing the battle with an Israeli victory.

=== D9R and early 21st century ===
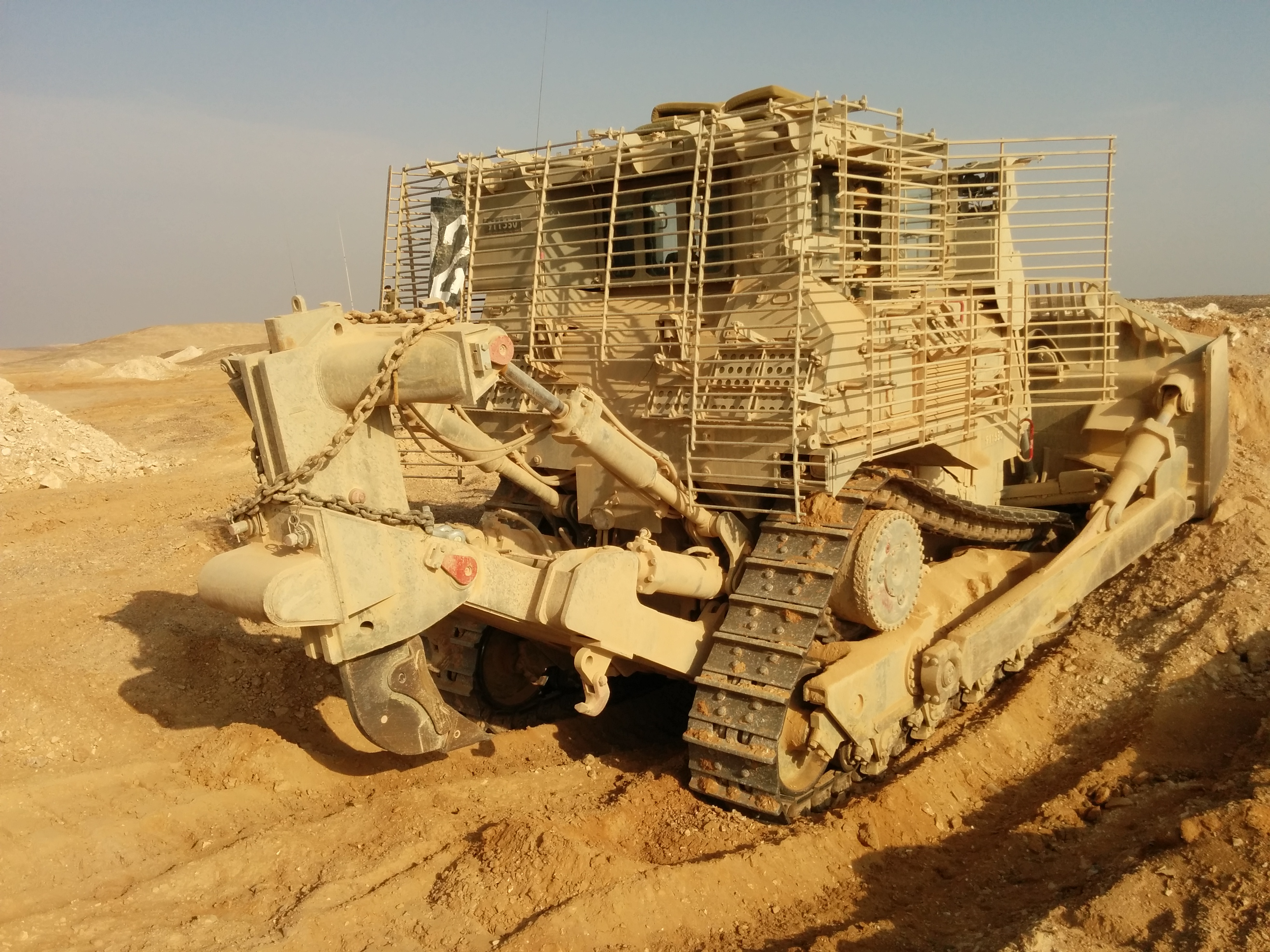
IDF D9R (3.5th generation armor) with slat armor) during training in the desert

During the early 2000s, the new D9R entered IDF service, equipped with a new generation armor designed by the IDF's MASHA (Hebrew: מש"א, lit. Restoration and Maintenance Center), Israel Aerospace Industries and Zoko Shiloovim/ITE (Caterpillar Inc. importers in Israel). Due to the increasing threat of shaped charge anti-tank rockets and anti-tank missile, the IDF introduced in 2005 a slat armor, installed in large numbers on the IDF D9R dozers in 2006. The slat armor proved to be effective and life-saving; its developers and installers won the IDF's Ground Command award.

The IDF also operates armored remote-controlled D9N bulldozers, called "Raam HaShachar" (Hebrew: רעם השחר, lit. "thunder of dawn") often incorrectly referred as "black thunder". The remote-controlled bulldozer has been used to clear mines. They were used in the Second Lebanon War in 2006 and the Gaza War (2008–2009).

Armored D9R bulldozers took part in the effort to extinguish 2010 Mount Carmel forest fire. The armored bulldozers opened routes to fire trucks and fire fighters into the heart of the fire. They also created fire breaks by clearing shrubbery and pushing up soil barriers in order to prevent the fire from spreading. They also helped extinguish fires by burying them in dirt and soil.

=== Gaza War (2008–2009) ===
In total, 100 D9s were deployed during the Gaza War (2008–2009), dubbed 'Operation Cast Lead' by Israel. The war led to extensive destruction in Gaza, especially of Palestinian homes; Israeli bulldozers and anti-tank mines were commonly used. According to Amnesty International:

"For the vast majority of homes destroyed, more than 3,000, and damaged, some 20,000, during Operation “Cast Lead”, the Israeli army has provided no evidence to substantiate its allegations that the houses were used as combat positions, as military command centres or to manufacture or store weapons – or for any other purpose which, under certain circumstances, would have made it lawful to target them."

In March 2009, The Jerusalem Post reported that the IDF intended to increase its use of unmanned D9 bulldozers, doubling the number it had. The following year Israel's Channel 2 reported that Caterpillar would delay the delivery of D9 bulldozers to the IDF while an investigation into the killing of Rachel Corrie took place.

=== 2014 Gaza War ===
IDF D9 armored bulldozers took major role in the 2014 Gaza War, both in defensive missions and offensive maneuvers. The D9s assisted other heavy equipment such as excavators and drillers in exposing and destroying cross-border underground tunnels penetrating into Israel, more than 30 of these tunnels were destroyed during the operation. The reserve mechanical engineering equipment (צמ"ה) and bulldozers battalion of the Central Command received a citation of recommendation (צל"ש, tzalash) from the Chief of Staff of the Israel Defense Forces.

D9s participated in the ground offensive, opening routes to tanks and infantry forces, and demolishing structures that were used by Palestinian militants. On July 27, one D9 was hit by an anti-tank missile, killing its operator and wounding its commander. Another D9 demolished the building from which the missile was launched, killing 8 militants and capturing two more. The crew received a citation of recommendation (צל"ש, tzalash) for their action.

=== D9T Panda ===
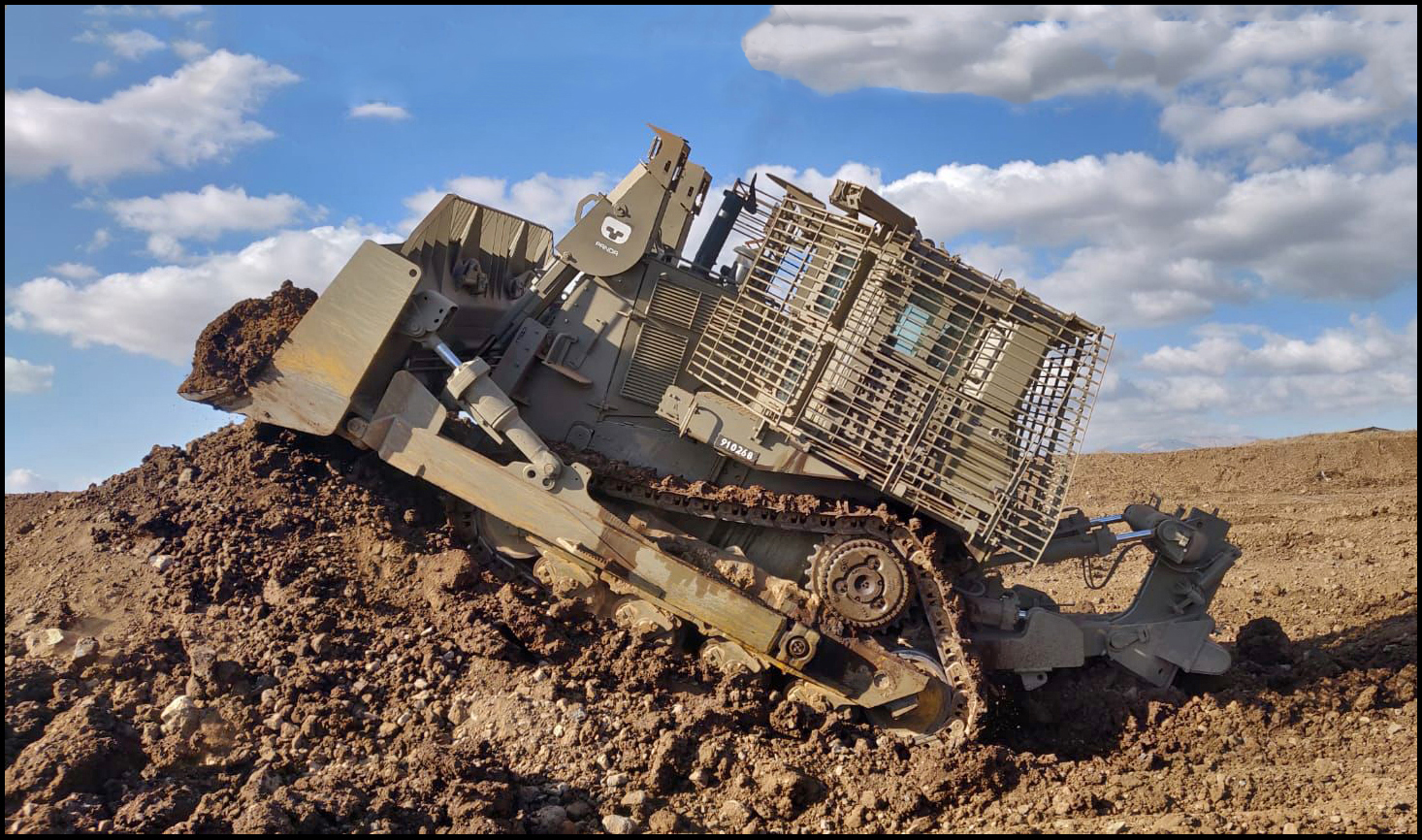
An IDF D9 'Panda' shown in an IDF press release

In 2018 the Israel Defense Forces Combat Engineering Corps started to deploy and operate the "Panda" – a remote-controlled version of an armored Caterpillar D9T bulldozer. In 2018, Israel Aerospace Industries announced that it had signed a contract to equip the IDF with more D9T Panda dozers. In 2022-2023 the Panda entered regular service with the IDF.

In 2019, Elbit Systems was awarded an IMOD contract to install the Iron Fist active protection system on the IDF's armored D9 bulldozers, to give them extra protection from anti-tank missiles.

=== Israel–Gaza war ===
During the Gaza war D9 Bulldozers were deployed on the ground offensive into Gaza where it was used to clear routes for ground forces to manoeuvre and expose shafts of Hamas combat tunnels. According to The Independent around 100 D9 bulldozers were expected to be used in the opening stage of the war. On 16 December 2023 the IDF captured the Kamal Adwan Hospital; in doing so IDF bulldozers crushed people who had been sheltering outside the hospital.

An investigation by CNN published in January 2024 used satellite imagery to identify sixteen burial grounds in Gaza that had been desecrated by the IDF using bulldozers to level cemeteries and dig up bodies. Later that month Ynet reported that the IDF would buy a further 100 bulldozers. Ynet also reported that the Biden administration in the US held up a shipment of 134 bulldozers; the bulldozers arrived in July 2025. Bulldozers were also used in the deliberate destruction of Gaza's environment, with an estimated 38–48% of Gaza's farmland and tree cover destroyed by Israel's military. Norwegian pension fund Kommunal Landspensjonskasse (in 2024) and the Government Pension Fund of Norway (in 2024) stopped investing in Caterpillar due to the use of its products by the IDF.

== Models in IDF service ==
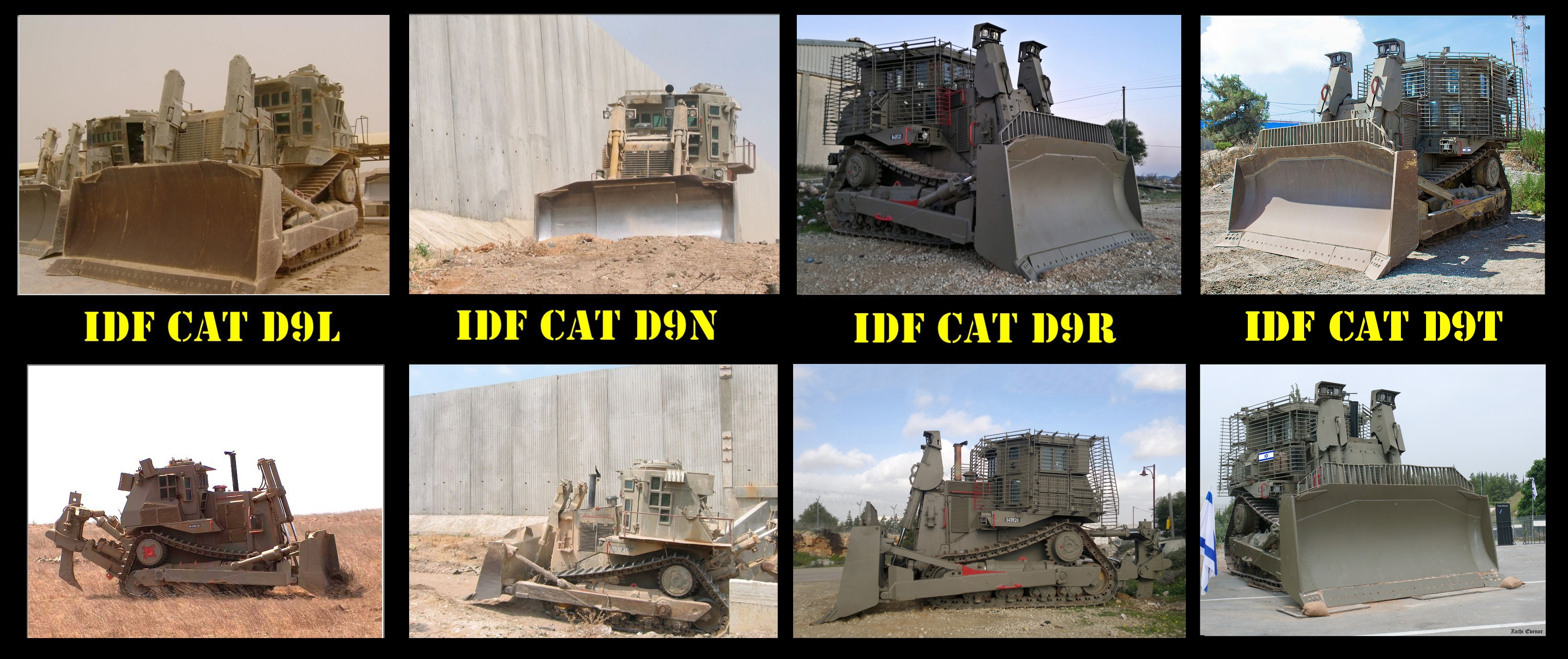
Different armored Caterpillar D9 generations in IDF service. From left to right: D9L: First generation armor, 460 hp (340 kW), drawbar pull 75 tonnes (74 long tons; 83 short tons). D9N: Second generation armor, 375–401 hp (280–299 kW). D9R: Third and 3.5 generation armor, 405 hp (302 kW), drawbar pull 71.6 tonnes (70.5 long tons; 78.9 short tons). D9T: Fourth generation armor, 410–436 hp (306–325 kW), drawbar pull 71.6 tonnes (70.5 long tons; 78.9 short tons).

== Criticism ==
Caterpillar's sales of D9 bulldozers to the Israeli military for use in the occupied Palestinian territories has long drawn criticism from human rights groups, society groups and responsible investment monitors.

Amnesty International released a report in May 2004 on home demolition in the occupied Palestinian territories in May 2004 that noted the risk of complicity for Caterpillar in human rights violations. The Office of the UN High Commissioner on Human Rights sent a letter to the company the next month warning that by selling bulldozers to the IDF Caterpillar may be complicit in human rights violations, specifically the right to food as the bulldozers were used to destroy Palestinian farms. Human Rights Watch reported the same year on the systematic use of D9 bulldozers in illegal demolitions throughout the occupied territories and called on Caterpillar to suspend its sales to Israel, citing the company's own code of conduct.

The punitive destruction of Palestinian homes has been described as a form of collective punishment, and in the view of Human Rights Watch may be considered a war crime.

The pro-Palestinian group Jewish Voice for Peace and four Roman Catholic orders of nuns planned to introduce a resolution at a Caterpillar shareholder meeting subsequent to the human rights reports asking for an investigation into whether Israel's use of the company's bulldozer to destroy Palestinian homes conformed with the company's code of business conduct. In response, the pro-Israel advocacy group StandWithUs urged its members to buy Caterpillar stock and to write letters of support to the company.

The US investment indexer MSCI removed Caterpillar from three of its indexes for socially responsible investments in 2012, citing the Israeli military’s use of its bulldozers in the Palestinian territories. In 2017, documents emerged that showed Caterpillar had hired private investigators to spy on the family of Rachel Corrie, the American human rights activist who was killed by a D9 bulldozer in Rafah in early 2003. In 2022, the Palestinian non-governmental organization Stop the Wall called Caterpillar, alongside Hyundai Heavy Industries, JCB and Volvo Group, complicit in what they referred to as Israel's ethnic cleansing of the occupied Palestinian territories through the use of its equipment in the demolition of eight Palestinian villages in Masafer Yatta in the southern West Bank.

in August 2025, Norway's $2 trillion sovereign wealth fund, the world's largest investment fund, has pulled out of Caterpillar over what it says is its involvement in Israeli human rights abuses in Gaza and the occupied West Bank.

== See also ==
- Israeli demolition of Palestinian property
- Israeli war crimes
- Collective punishment
- Mahmoud Tawalbe, head of the Palestinian Islamic Jihad, killed in the Battle of Jenin (2002) by an IDF D9
- Rachel Corrie, an ISM activist killed by an IDF D9 while acting as a human shield
