= Armored bulldozer =

Bulldozer modified for use in combat engineering

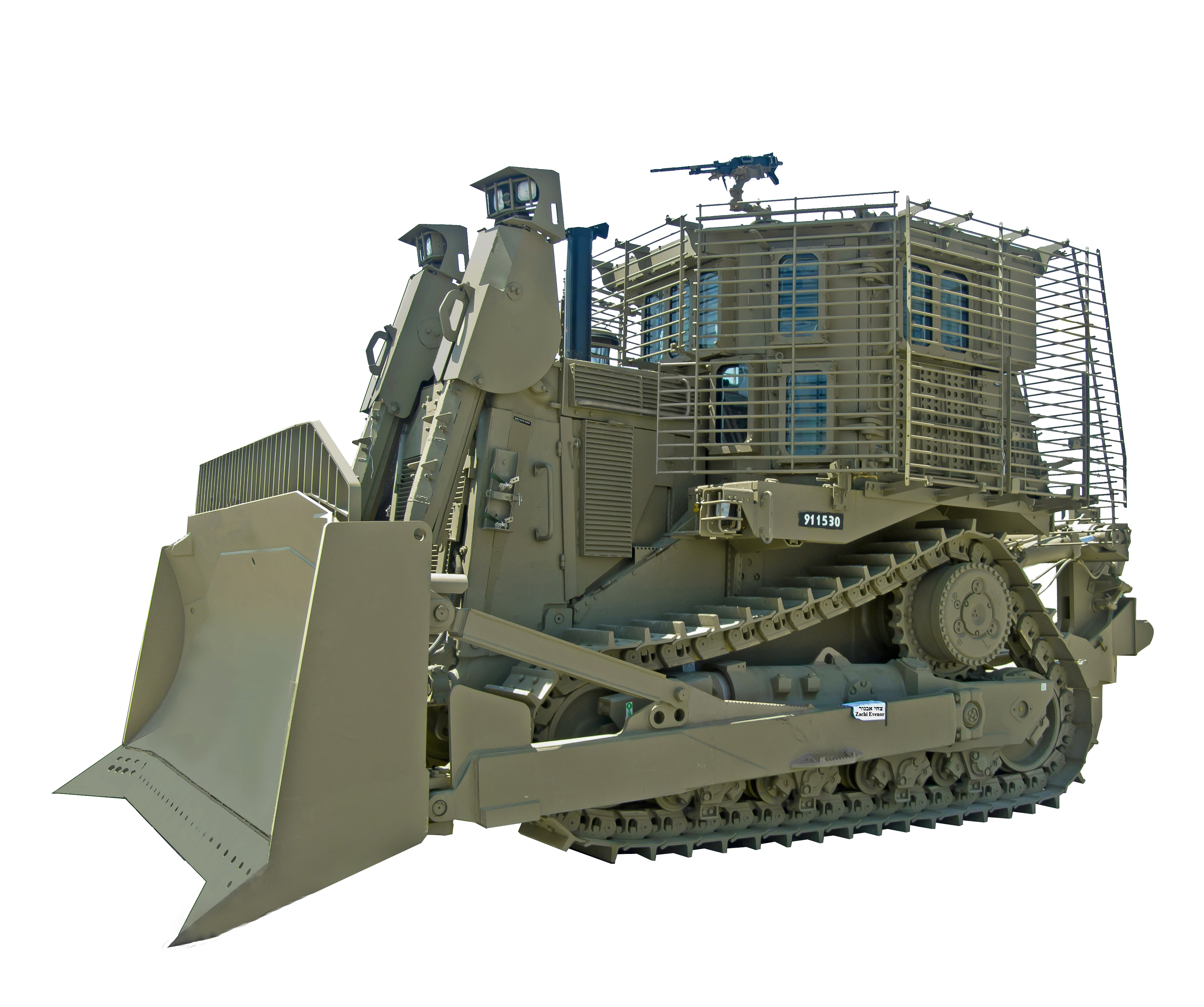
An IDF Caterpillar D9: a Caterpillar D9R bulldozer with Israeli armor used by the Israel Defense Forces

The armored bulldozer is a basic tool of combat engineering. These combat engineering vehicles combine the earth moving capabilities of the bulldozer with armor which protects the vehicle and its operator in or near combat. Most are civilian bulldozers modified by the addition of vehicle armor/military equipment, but some are tanks stripped of armament and fitted with a dozer blade. Some tanks (called tankdozers) have bulldozer blades while retaining their armament, but that does not make them armored bulldozers as such, because combat remains the primary role—earth moving is a secondary task.

== World War II ==
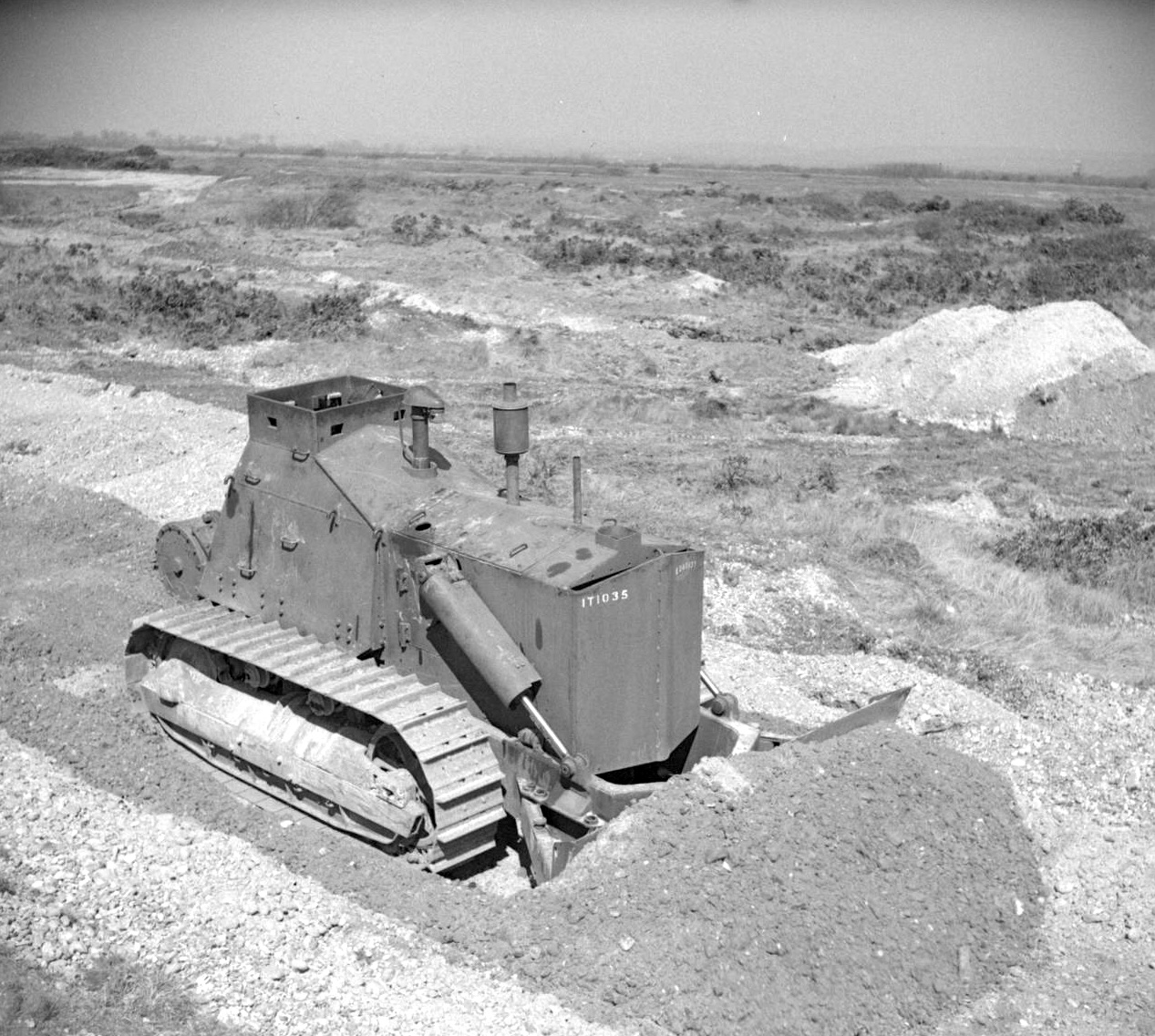
D-7 bulldozer, 1944

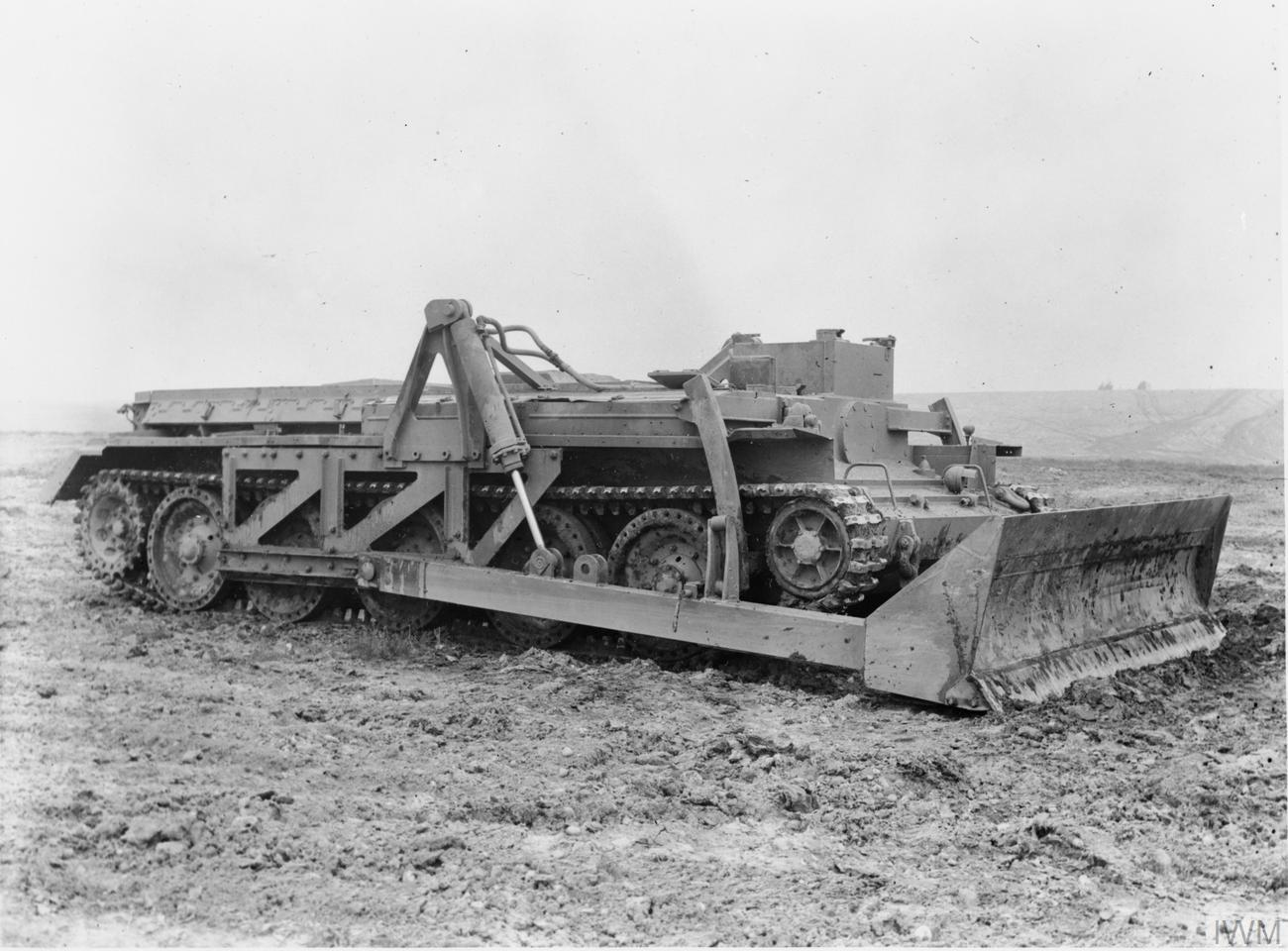
Centaur bulldozer

British, World War II armored bulldozers

The first armored bulldozer (D7A) was developed by the British during World War II. It was a conventional Caterpillar D7 bulldozer fitted with armor to protect the driver and the engine. The work was carried out by Jack Olding & Company Ltd of Hatfield. The bulldozer was one of several specialist armored vehicles that were collectively referred to as "Hobart's Funnies" and were operated by the British 79th Armoured Division in support of armored assaults.

The bulldozers were produced in preparation for the Battle of Normandy with the tasks of clearing the invasion beaches of obstacles and quickly making roads accessible by clearing rubble and filling in bomb craters. As Allied armies advanced through Europe, the armored bulldozer was discovered to be too slow—there was a need for a well-armored, obstacle clearing vehicle fast enough to keep up with tank formations. The need was met by the Centaur Bulldozer—a Centaur tank with the turret removed and a bulldozer blade fitted. Centaur bulldozers were still in use with the British Army at the time of the Korean War.

== Modern use ==
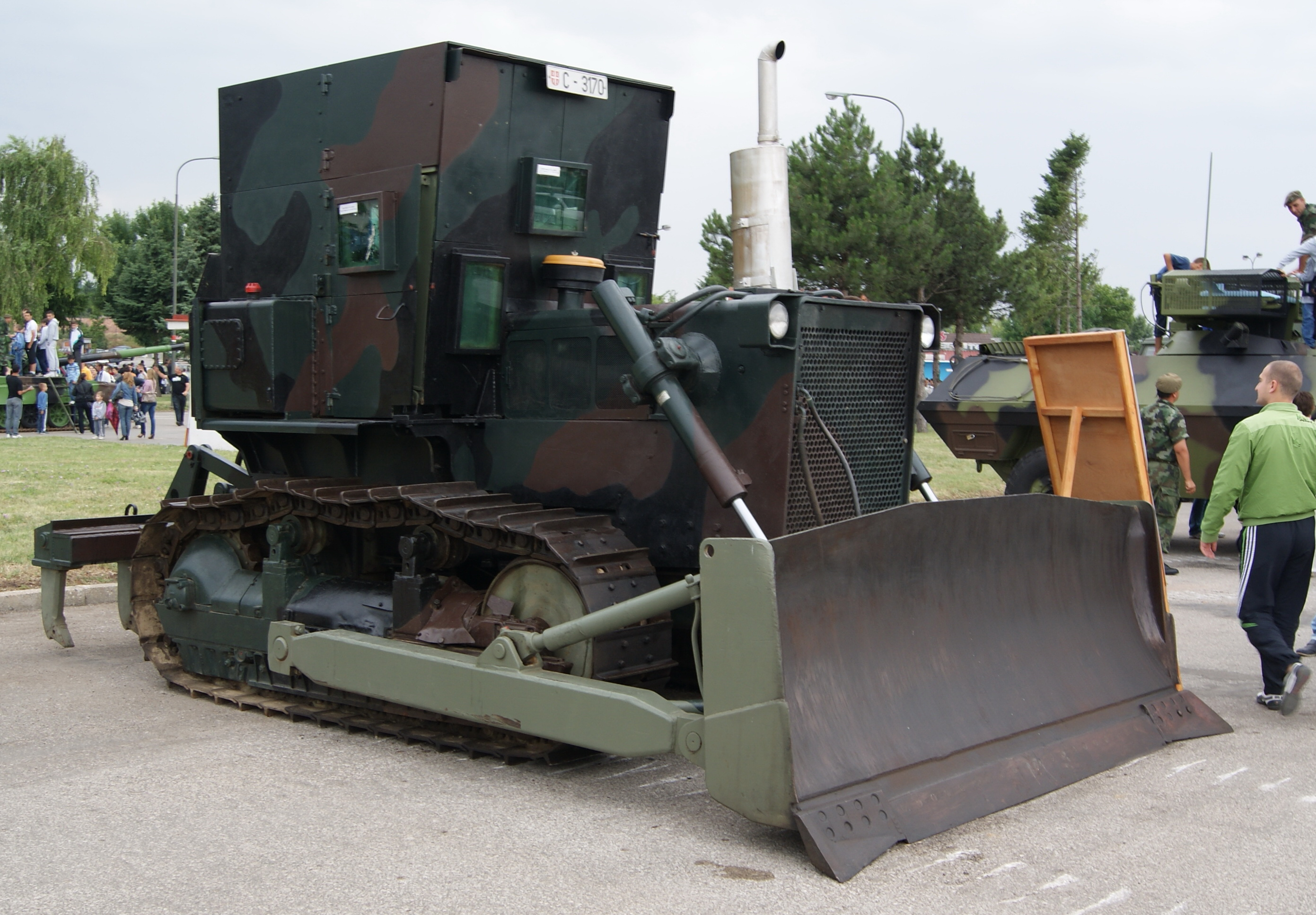
Armored bulldozer of the Serbian Armed Forces

Modern armored bulldozers are often based on the Caterpillar D7 and D9. The attributes which make the D9 popular for major construction projects make it desirable for military applications as well. It has been particularly effective for the Israel Defense Forces (IDF) and for the United States armed forces (the Marine Corps and the US Army) and the Canadian Army in Iraq, both using an armor kit developed and manufactured by Israel. After the success of the armored D9, Caterpillar Defense Products started to manufacture and sell armored bulldozers, mainly for the United States Armed Forces.

=== Israel ===
The Israeli Armored D9 is a Caterpillar D9 bulldozer that was modified by the Israel Defense Forces, Israeli Military Industries and Israel Aerospace Industries to increase the survivability of the dozer in hostile environments and enable it to withstand heavy attacks. The D9R, the latest generation of D9 bulldozers in IDF service, has 405 to 410 horsepower (302 to 306 kW) and drawbar pull of 71.6 tonnes-force (702 kN). It has a crew of two, an operator and a commander. It is operated by the TZAMA (צמ"ה = ציוד מכני הנדסי, Mechanical Engineering Equipment) units of the Israeli Engineering Corps.

The main IDF modification is the installation of an Israeli-made armor kit, which provides armor protection to the mechanical systems and to the operator cabin. The operator and commander are protected inside an armored cabin ("the cockpit"), with bulletproof windows to protect against bombs, machine gun, and sniper fire. The IDF also developed a slat armor add-on to deflect RPG rounds. The modified D9 bulldozers can be fitted with disparate features including crew-operated machine guns, smoke projectors, or grenade launchers. The IDF uses the D9 for a wide variety of engineering tasks including earthworks, digging moats, mounting sand barriers, building fortifications, rescuing stuck, overturned or damaged armored fighting vehicles (along with M88 Recovery Vehicle), clearing landmines, detonating improvised explosive devices and explosives, clearing terrain obstacles and opening routes for armored fighting vehicles and infantry, as well as structures demolition, including under fire.

During the Second Intifada the armored D9 bulldozer was an effective tool against Palestinian fighters, as they were almost impervious to Palestinian weapons and withstood even RPGs and belly charges with more than 100 kg and even half a ton of explosive. Therefore, they were used for opening safe routes for IDF forces and detonate explosive charges. The bulldozer was used extensively to clear shrubbery and structures which could be used as cover. During the Battle of Jenin, armored bulldozers were used to neutralize roadside bombs that lined the alleys of the camp, according to Israeli Military Intelligence. About a dozen armored Caterpillar D-9 bulldozers were deployed, widening alleys, clearing paths for tanks, and detonating booby traps. Lieutenant Colonel Ofek Buchris continued to employ the extensive use of bulldozers and developed a method to expose IDF soldiers to less risk: first, a bulldozer would ram the corner of a house, opening a hole, and then an IDF Achzarit troop carrier arrived and troops disembarked and went into the house. They cleared it of any militants found inside.

After several incidents where armed Palestinians barricaded themselves inside houses to prevent house demolition and killed soldiers attempting to breach the entries, the IDF developed the "Noal Sir Lachatz" (נוהל סיר לחץ "Pressure Cooker protocol") in which D9s and other engineering vehicles were used to bring them out by razing the houses. The Israeli military would use armoured bulldozers extensively during the Israeli invasion of the Gaza Strip. They would also be used to damage infrastructure during the 2024 Israeli military operation in the West Bank. In 2003, an American peace activist, Rachel Corrie, was killed by an IDF armored bulldozer in Rafah while attempting to prevent the destruction of Palestinian homes in the Rafah Refugee Camp.

=== United States ===
During the first Gulf War the United States purchased tractor protection kits (TPK) from the Israel Military Industries (IMI) for their Caterpillar D7 bulldozers. The armored bulldozers were mainly used in mine clearing applications. During the preparation to the war in Iraq in 2003 the United States Army purchased several D9 armor kits from the IDF and used them to produce similarly fortified D9s. They have been used to clear destroyed vehicles from roads, dig moats, erect earthen-barriers, and construct field fortifications. D9s have been used to raze houses which sheltered insurgent snipers. Military reports on the Conflict in Iraq say that the D9s are very effective and they have "received highly favorable reviews from all that benefited from their use".

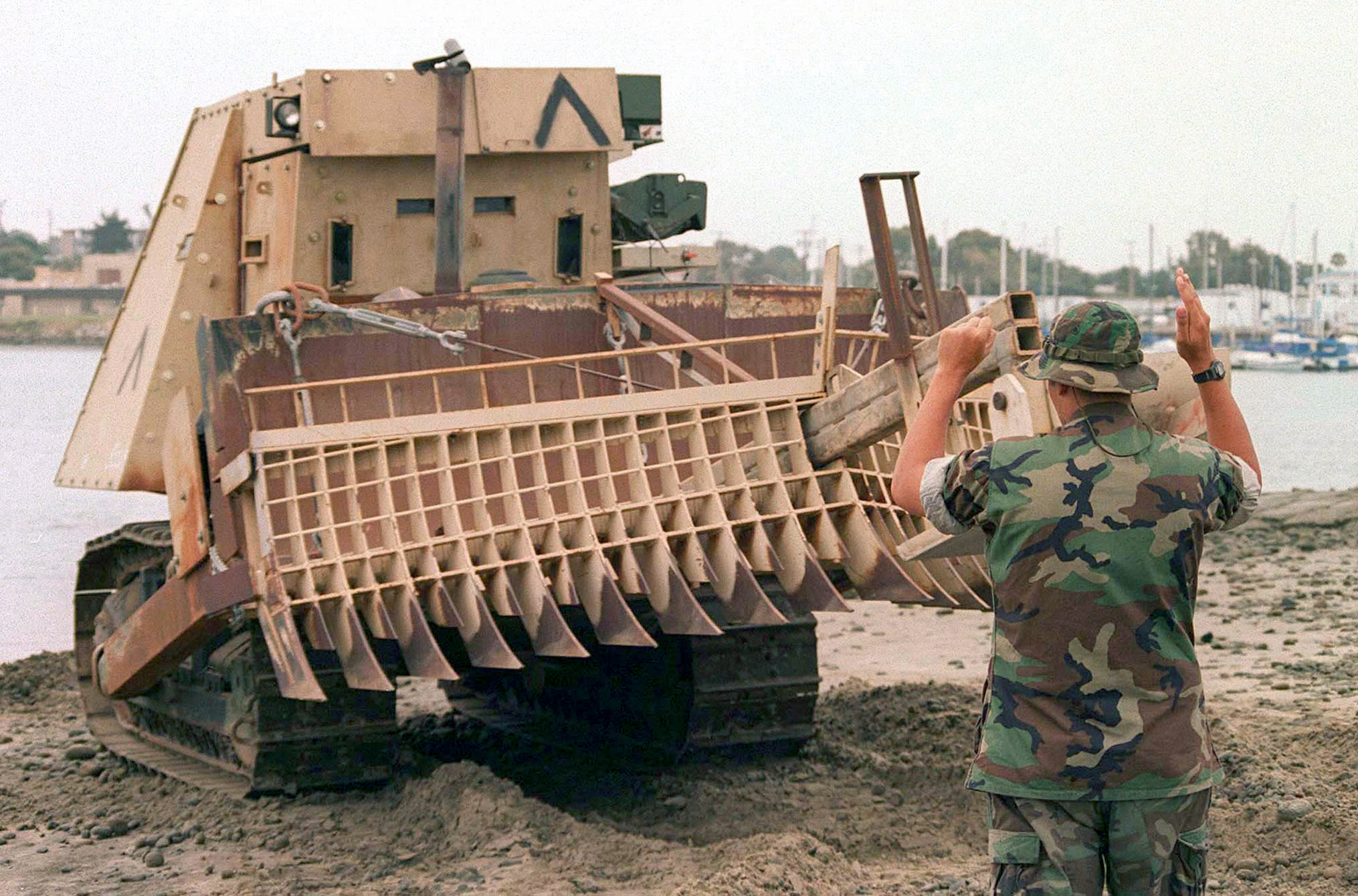
D7 with a mine-clearing blade

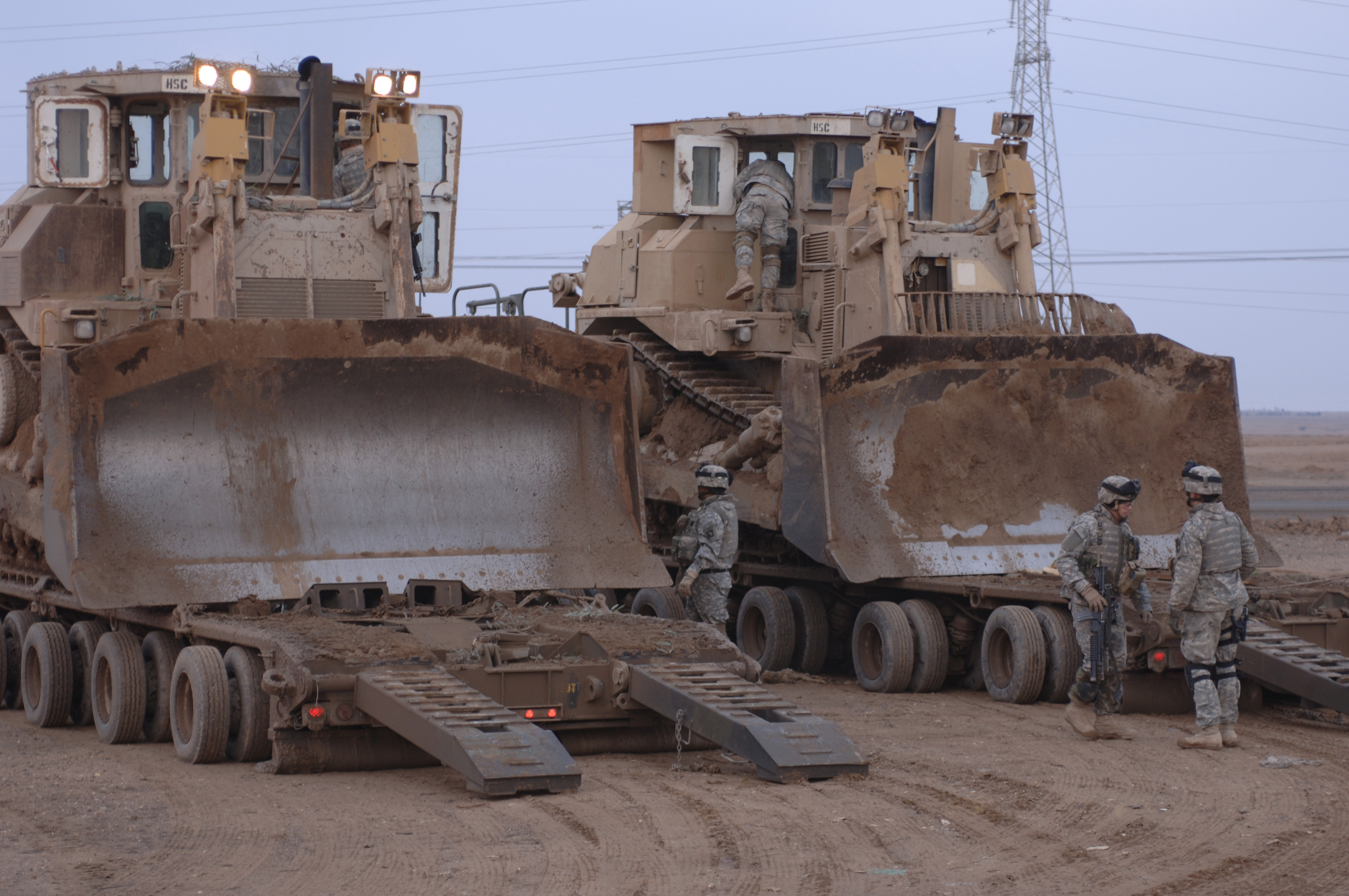
US Army D9Rs with Israeli IDF armor kits

=== Other military forces ===
The Soviet military developed a dozer-blade-equipped armored vehicle, the IMR series, based on the T-72 platform. They are in use by Russia and Ukraine during the 2022 Russian Invasion of Ukraine.

== See also ==
- Bob Semple tank
- Demining
- Engineering vehicles
- Marvin Heemeyer – known for the 2004 "Killdozer" rampage
