= Moses Lugassy =

- Born: 1852; Morocco
- Died: 9 March 1909 (aged 56–57)
- Occupation: Businessman

Moshe (French spelling: Mochè) "Moses" Lugassy (1852 – 9 March 1909) was a Moroccan born British-Jewish businessman, a social activist and a Zionist leader. He was part of the Jewish circle of public influencers called "The Enlighted Hebrews" ("חוג המשכילים העבריים") that was active in Morocco.

Some consider him to be the first Zionist activist of the Moroccan Jewry.

Lugassy spoke Hebrew, Arabic, French and English.

== Biography ==
Lugassy was born in Mogador, Morocco – where there are records of a rabbinical family of the same surname that lived there since the 17th Century. In his teenage years while Morocco was part of the French influence, Lugassy actually was attracted to English despite studying in French. After graduating, Moses and his brother moved to London and started working in the local textile industry. It was there where Moses met his wife, and where he became a naturalized British citizen.

Lugassy entered the furnitures and rugs businesses in Manchester. In 1879, Lugassy was appointed as a member to the Society of Biblical Archaeology.

Moses kept in touch with his family who remained in Mogador, and occasionally visited them. In 1890, the local municipality had decided to rise hardships on the Jews. They were ordered to be limited into living in the Jewish Ghetto only. Lugassy was contacted by his family and was informed of the rising anti-Semitism and about the cries for help from his community back home. Lugassy, who was in Manchester (or in London according to other scholars) at the time, returned to Morocco for that summer, and decided to use his wealth to affect the local authorities into changing their mind about the Jews' freedom of residence. Lugassy then led a six men delegation to the Moroccan town hall and negotiate the situation. This led to the Jewish Ghetto's enlargement.

Lugassy, who by December 1886 and January 1887 tried to found an Alliance Israélite Universelle school, also founded a local "Agudat Achim" ("Brotherhood Union" in Hebrew) school for the local Jewish kids, and ran it for its first phase. Afterwards, Lugassy assembled the Jews in their center and gave a speech in both Hebrew and Arabic, expressing his anger at the local Jewish leadership which did not contribute to their peers' wellbeing and only wrongly used their taxes; He had published all of the Mogador updates in the Jewish Newspaper "Times of Morocco". Lugassy had founded a Zionist group called "Ahavat Zion" ("the love of Zion" in Hebrew) and registered over 50 local Jews in Mogador; or "Shaarai Zion" ("The Gates of Zion" in Hebrew) where he led the organization for 2 congresses.

In September of the year 1899, Lugassy had expressed that he feels like the year 1900 will be the end of the Jewish exile. He was a thrilled Zionist and in July 1900 contacted Benjamin Zeev Herzl, who appointed him as a member of the Zionist Congress, where Lugassy represented the Jewish Communities of Morocco for two seats.

Lugassy immigrated in his later days to Jamaica with his wife, while his children ran the British based business. He died in Manchester, Jamaica, and was buried there.
