= Oshri Lugasi =

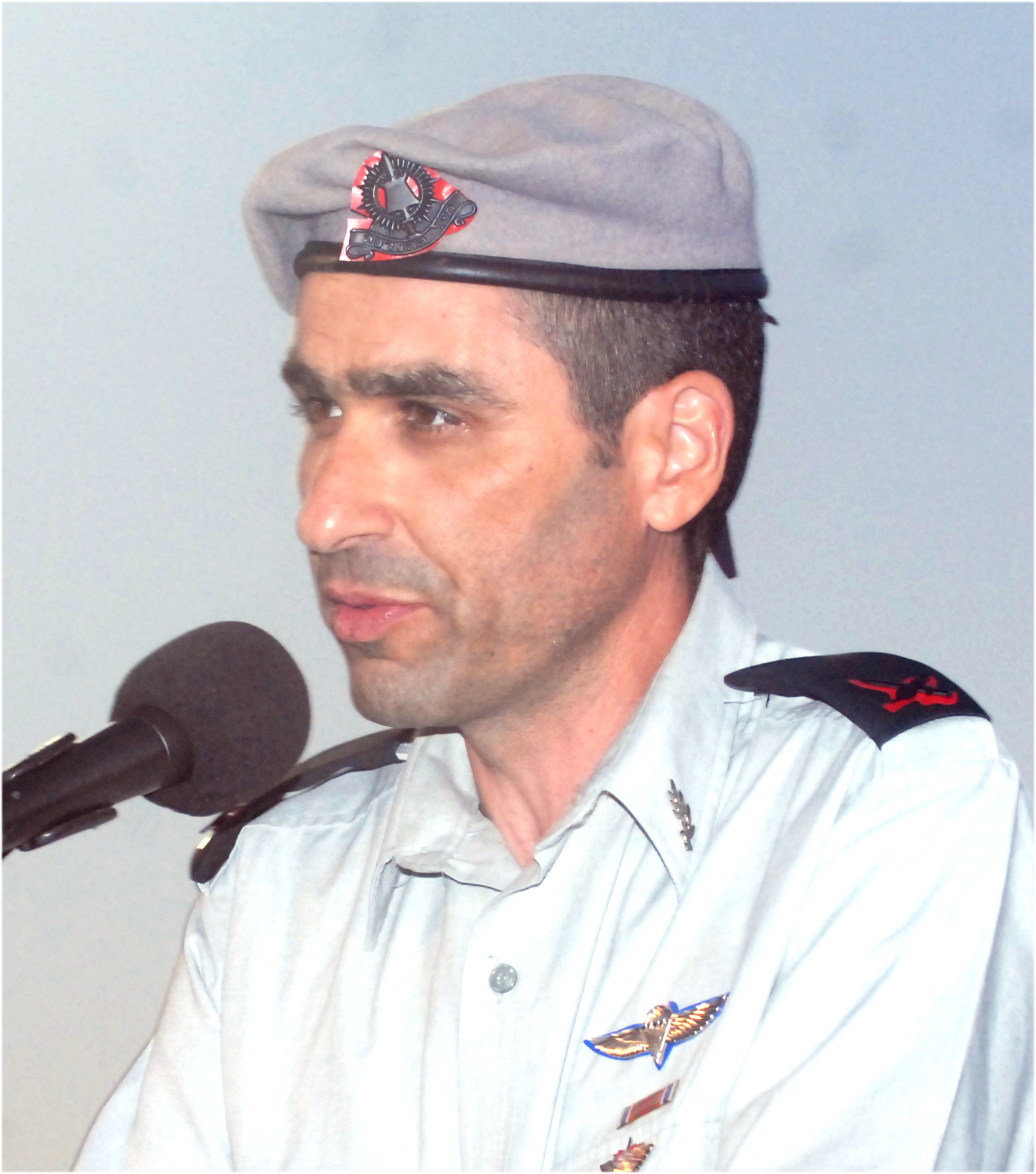
Brigade General Oshri Lugasi

Oshri Lugasi (Hebrew: אושרי לוגסי; born February 17, 1972) is brigadier general who serves as the chief Combat Engineering Corps officer of the Israel Defense Forces.

Lugasi performed most of his service in the Combat Engineering Corps, where he served as the second in command of Battalion 605; in 2004 he was named the Battalion's commander. In the Second Lebanon War Lugasi's battalion was called to the frontlines while they were tasked with a mission in Ramallah, his battalion dealt with opening lanes for the IDF and participated in The battle of Wadi as-Sulouqi as Lugasi was situated in the frontline with the IDF Caterpillar D9 units who were the ones to break through into the Hezbollah-occupied territories. Lugasi and his D-9 units managed to break through 14 kilometres within four and a half hours under heavy fire. The battle was fierce and twoIDF combatants died during the fighting.

After the war was over Lugasi was assigned to the position of the IDF's Northern Command Chief Combat Engineering Officer. Afterwards he also served as the second in command in the Judea and Samaria Division, and as the Head of Organizing in the GOC Army Headquarters. On September 30, 2014, Lugasi was named chief Combat Engineering Corps officer, succeeding Yossi Morali.
