= Victory for Us Is to See You Suffer =

2007 book by Philip C. Winslow

Victory for Us Is to See You Suffer: Inside the West Bank with the Palestinians and the Israelis
- First edition cover
- Author: Philip C. Winslow
- Language: English
- Subject: Israeli–Palestinian conflict
- Genre: History
- Publisher: Beacon Press
- Publication date: 2007
- Pages: 248
- ISBN: 978-0-8070-6907-3
- OCLC: 227921508

Victory for Us Is to See You Suffer is a 2007 book on the Israeli–Palestinian conflict written by Philip C. Winslow. In the book, Winslow, a former U.N. relief worker and journalist, reports on his experiences in the West Bank during the Second Intifada.

Winslow explains the unusual title of the book in this passage, as follows:

Ami Ayalon, a peace campaigner and member of the Knesset, was asked if he stood by his oft-quoted remark that the Palestinians and the Israelis hate each other. "I cannot say that I hate Palestinians, but I think, as a nation, as a society, yes, most Israelis hate Palestinians and most Palestinians hate Israelis... I had a very interesting meeting in London during the intifada. A Palestinian friend approached me [and said]: 'Ami, we won. We Palestinians won.'... I asked him, 'Are you crazy? What do you mean "We won"? You are losing so many people... and we are losing so many people. What is the whole essence of victory?' He said, 'Ami you don't understand us. Victory for us is to see you suffer. This is all we want. Finally, after so many years, we are not the only ones to suffer in the Middle East.'" ...It was a double-edged sword. Aylon added, "In a way it is the same for us. We suffer, we lost many people, and [at] a certain point we were looking for revenge."
