= Miri Eisin =

Israeli journalist and retired colonel

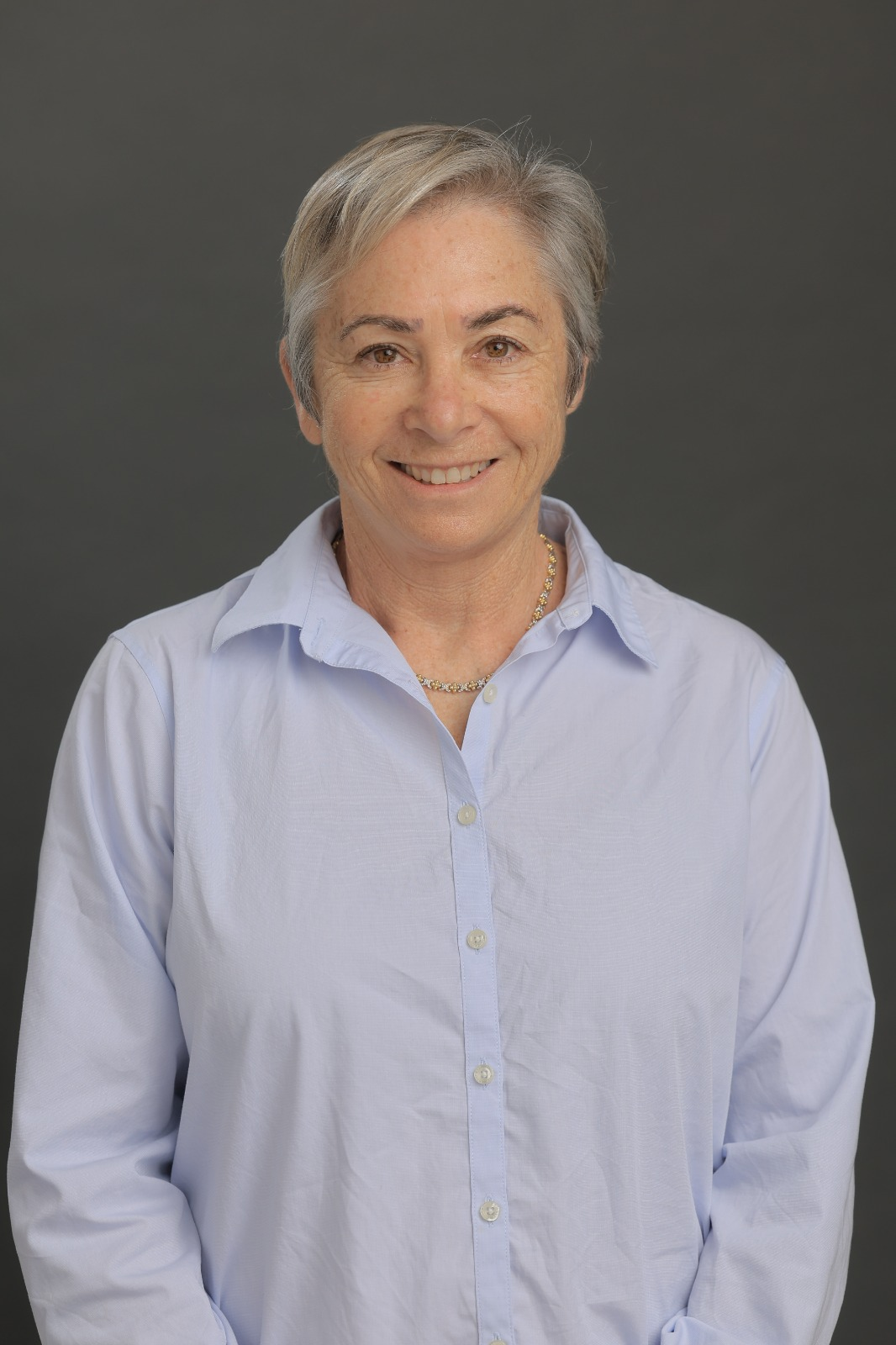
Miri Eisin

Miri Eisin (Hebrew: מירי אייזין) is a retired colonel of the Israel Defense Forces (IDF) with a background in military intelligence.

== Biography ==
Eisin was born in California and raised in Israel. Eisin's Bat Mitzvah, held in a Reform Synagogue in Tel Aviv, was shown on the Israeli television show Mabat Sheni (Lit. Second Look). At the time, a non-Orthodox Bat Mitzvah where men and women sat together was very rare in Israel. While in twelfth grade, Eisin was sent as an emissary for Israel on a two-month speaking tour in the United States.

Eisen graduated from high school in Israel in 1980 and was drafted into the Israel Defense Forces (IDF). She was placed into military intelligence. Eisin pushed hard to be accepted into officers course. She served 20 years in the IDF and retired with the rank of colonel. In the entire history of Israel, only two percent of colonels have been women.

In 2006, Eisin became the foreign media advisor to Israeli Prime Minister Ehud Olmert. She was the first woman in Israel's history to serve in the position. Eisin started the job when the Second Lebanon War broke out in July 2006. In November 2007, Eisin accompanied Olmert to the Annapolis Conference, a Middle East peace conference held in Annapolis, Maryland. In December 2007, Eisin resigned from her position in order to spend more time with her three young children. She was replaced by foreign ministry veteran Mark Regev.

Eisin has an undergraduate degree in political science and Middle Eastern Studies from Tel Aviv University. She went to Haifa University and the IDF Defense College for graduate studies in security studies. Eisin is fluent in English and Hebrew and is proficient in French.
