= Palestinian Society for the Protection of Human Rights =

Human rights organizations based in the State of Palestine

The Palestinian Society for the Protection of Human Rights and the Environment (Arabic: الجمعية الفلسطينية لحماية حقوق الإنسان) was "dedicated to preserving human rights through legal advocacy". Also known as LAW (as in Law Society) (Arabic: al-qanoun), this legal society is an affiliate to the International Commission of Jurists (ICJ), The World Organization Against Torture (OMCT) and the International Federation of Human Rights Leagues (FIDH) and is a member of the Euro-Mediterranean Human Rights Network.

== Views ==
The group accuses Israel of apartheid and has recommended action against Israel at the World Conference Against Racism (WCAR) and prosecution in various international courts. They also defend victims of alleged human rights abuses in both Israeli and Palestinian courts. A nearly daily newsletter reported all rights violations. A monthly magazine was published in English and Arabic.

The organization seeks to further the cause of Palestinians through the law courts rather than through violence, but some Israelis accuse the group of selectively ignoring alleged crimes committed by the Palestinian Authority and presenting a unilateral position of a propagandist nature.

== Funding ==
The group was funded by European countries, Austria also provided a conscientious objector performing community service.

=== Misuse of donations controversy ===
A 2004 investigation by some donors found that financial aid was misappropriated by LAW's Board. Soon after, many donors ceased funding. As a result, the organization had to lay off staff and to close down the office in Al-Ram. The LAW website has been inaccessible since 2005 which may indicate that the organization is no longer active.
