= Pressure Cooker procedure =

Israeli military tactic

The Pressure Cooker procedure (or Pressure Cooker protocol; Hebrew: נוהל סיר לחץ, Nohal Seer Lahatz) is an IDF tactic designed to deal with an enemy barricaded in a house. During the 1990s, the procedure was designated for cases in which a terrorist barricades himself in a house with hostages, and defined the level of measures that must be taken in order to release the hostages safely and resolve the crisis. During the years of the First Intifada, and even more so after the outbreak of the Second Intifada, the procedure was changed and adapted to the more common situation, in which a terrorist barricades himself in a house without hostages. The purpose of the procedure is to resolve the crisis by the surrendering of the barricaded, or if no other choice left, killing him, without harming innocents and while minimizing the risk to the IDF soldiers. Since the outbreak of the second intifada, a main component of the tactic is the Mechanical Engineering Equipment of the Combat Engineering Corps that operates shielded mechanical engineering equipment to demolish the house where the terrorists are entrenched.
