= Use of child suicide bombers by Palestinian militant groups =

Child exploitation by Palestinian militant groups

As part of the Arab–Israeli conflict, especially during the Second Intifada from 2000 to 2005, Palestinian militant groups used children for suicide bombings. Minors were sometimes used as messengers and couriers, and according to Israeli sources as fighters. The involvement of children in armed conflict was condemned by international human rights organizations. Amnesty International noted, "Palestinian armed groups have repeatedly shown total disregard for... the right to life, by deliberately targeting Israeli civilians and by using Palestinian children in armed attacks," and that, "Children are susceptible to recruitment by manipulation... including a desire to avenge relatives or friends killed by the Israeli army."

== Background ==
According to Haaretz, a Shin Bet report published on September 26, 2004, stated that from September 2000 to September 2004, 292 Palestinian children were arrested on suspicion of involvement in terrorism.

According to the Palestinian Human Rights Monitoring Group, in the Second Intifada, children were used as "messengers and couriers, and in some cases as fighters and suicide bombers in attacks on Israeli soldiers and civilians" during the Second Intifada. Fatah, Hamas, Palestinian Islamic Jihad Movement and the Popular Front for the Liberation of Palestine have all been implicated in involving children in this way. The issue was brought to world attention after a widely televised incident in which a mentally handicapped Palestinian teenager, Hussam Abdo, was disarmed at an Israeli checkpoint.

== Suicide bombings by minors ==
In late 2004, Human Rights Watch claimed that at least 10 bombers aged under 18 had been used by Palestinian militants to carry out attacks against Israel in the past four years.

The main Palestinian militant groups have publicly stated their opposition to the use of children in suicide attacks.

Hamas, Palestinian Islamic Jihad and the al-Aqsa Martyrs' Brigade were all linked to underage attacks in the HRW report.

A report by the Coalition to Stop the Use of Child Soldiers, similarly stated that there were at least nine documented suicide bombings against Israeli soldiers and civilians involving Palestinian minors between October 2000 and March 2004. The report also found that "there was no evidence of systematic recruitment of children by Palestinian armed groups". Human Rights Watch accepted the report and wrote that "there was no evidence that the Palestinian Authority (PA) recruited or used child soldiers".

Some senior Palestinian militant figures had previously said that they considered individuals aged 16 or above as adults.

On November 1, 2004, 16-year-old Amar Alfar engaged in a suicide bombing attack in Tel Aviv's Carmel Market, killing three Israelis, that was claimed by the Popular Front for the Liberation of Palestine. Alfar's mother and father condemned what they saw as the exploitation of their son:

God will curse those who recruited Amar. I had heard the stories about recruiting children in Nablus but I didn't think they were true... Yes, it is difficult here for everyone because of the occupation, and life in Nablus is intolerable, but children should not be exploited in this way.

Following the attack, the Popular Front for the Liberation of Palestine, admitted it had made a mistake and vowed to improve its age checking procedures.

Umm Nidal was a Palestinian militant who supported several of her sons in their armed attacks against Israel. She has been described by ABC News as having sent three of her sons on "suicide missions" and as a "mother of suicide bombers". According to Al Jazeera, one of her sons, who was 17 years old, was shot dead while conducting a shooting attack on an Israeli settlement with her approval, another was killed while preparing an attack and a third one was killed while transporting rockets. She said "I love my children, but as Muslims we pressure ourselves and sacrifice our emotions for the interest of the homeland. The greater interest takes precedence to the personal interest". She was later elected to the Palestinian legislature in 2006 on the Hamas-led Change and Reform electoral list.

== Searches and prosecution of minors ==
=== By the State of Israel ===
On March 24, 2004, one week after capturing a bomb in the bag of 12-year-old Abdullah Quran, Hussam Abdo, a 16-year-old Palestinian (who initially claimed he was 14), was captured in a checkpoint near Nablus wearing an explosive belt. The young boy was paid by the Tanzim militia to detonate himself at the checkpoint. IDF soldiers manning the checkpoint were suspicious of him and told him to stay away from people. Later, an EOD team arrived and by using a police-sapper robot, removed the explosive belt from him. Hussam allegedly said that he was offered 100 NIS and sex with virgins if he would perform the task. He said his friends mocked him in class.

On May 30, 2004, The New York Times reported Israeli allegations that the al-Aqsa Martyrs' Brigades were using children to recruit classmates as suicide bombers, and that one child, Nasser Awartani, 15, of Nablus allegedly recruited four of his classmates, one of whom was claimed by the Shabak report on Awartani to be Hussam Abdo.

On July 3, the Israeli Security Forces claim that they thwarted a suicide bombing that it claimed was to have been carried out by 16-year-old Muataz Takhsin Karini. Karini and two of his operators were arrested, while a 12 kg explosive belt was detonated safely by an Israeli EOD crew. On June 5, IDF forces detonated two explosive belts concealed in schoolbags. On July 14, the Shin Bet in Kfar Maskha arrested 17-year-old suicide bomber Ahmed Bushkar, from Nablus.

On September 23, 2004, a day before Yom Kippur, the Shin Bet and the Israel Police claimed they had captured of a 15-year-old suicide bomber and a 7 kg explosive belt in the village of Dir-Hana in the Western Galilee. The 15-year-old was part of joint terrorist cell of Tanzim and Palestinian Islamic Jihad from Yamon village near Jenin. The four were Palestinians who worked illegally in Israel. The 15-year-old was allegedly paid 1000 shekels in order to blow himself up in Afula.

According to nrg Maariv, on September 27, 2004, a 15-year-old suspected suicide bomber was arrested in Nablus. On October 28, Ayub Maaruf, a 16-year-old Fatah suicide bomber, was arrested near Nablus along with his operator.

According to Israel Defense Forces, on February 3, 2005, Mahmoud Tabouq, a 15 or 16-year-old Palestinian, was arrested at the Huwara checkpoint near Nablus carrying a bag containing an explosive belt, an improvised gun, and 20 bullets. The belt was detonated safely by a Magav bomb squad.

According to Ynet, on April 12, a 15-year-old Palestinian boy identified as Hassan Hashash was caught at Huwara checkpoint hiding five pipe bombs under his coat. He tried to ignite them with a match when the soldiers apprehended him. Later he was disarmed, and sappers detonated the bombs safely. Family members of Hashash suggested that he deliberately carried bombs into an IDF checkpoint in order to be arrested and study for the "Bagrut" final exams in the Israeli jail.

According to Hebrew language sources, on April 27, two teenagers, aged 15 (though other sources cite their ages as 12 and 13), were arrested at a checkpoint near Jenin after 11 explosive charges were found on them. One teenager was recruited by the Palestinian Islamic Jihad and the other by the al-Aqsa Martyrs' Brigades. The two told interrogators that they had been acting as couriers for terrorists, but security forces suspect they planned to get close to the soldiers and then detonate the charges.

According to Ynet, on May 22, Iad Ladi, a 14 or 15-year-old Palestinian suicide bomber was arrested at a Huwara checkpoint near Nablus. This was the 14th time during April and May that a Palestinian child was arrested as a bomber or a courier. Two days later, another 15-year-old Palestinian teen carrying two pipe bombs, was caught at the same checkpoint. On June 15, The Israeli press reported that the Shabak arrested a Palestinian militant cell in Nablus during the previous month. The cell included eight members, four of whom were child suicide bombers. The cell was on the verge of committing another suicide bombing attack using the four children. According to the Shin Bet, the cell was directed and funded by the Fatah's Tanzim branch and the Lebanese group Hezbollah.

According to Ynet, on October 11, 2005, a 14-year-old Palestinian boy was arrested by IDF forces. He told the soldiers he was forced to agree to commit a suicide bombing when two terrorists from Fatah's Tanzim faction threatened to murder him by spreading a leaflet accusing him of collaboration unless he agreed. They took pictures of him with a gun and the Qur'an and forced him to write his own will.

According to Ynet, on August 27, 2007, a 15-year-old Palestinian boy carrying two explosive devices on his body was arrested in the northern Gaza Strip after he attempted to carry out an attack against soldiers operating in the area against Palestinians launching Qassam rockets on Israeli civilians across the border inside Israel.

== Media depictions and public diplomacy ==
In 2002, during the Second Intifada, the Israeli military used an image of a Palestinian toddler dressed as a suicide bomber as part of Israel's public diplomacy. The photo provided to international media by the IDF allegedly showed an 18-month infant dressed like a suicide bomber. The BBC published the photo but said, "there was no independent confirmation of the authenticity of the photograph". The IDF claimed to have found the photo in a private family photo album, while raiding a suspect's home. Dawn News reported that the photo was found in the home of a wanted militant named "Al Khalil". According to BBC News the baby's grandfather, Redwan Abu Turki, said that the dressing of the infant baby as a bomber was from a rally at the university and "the picture was taken just for the fun of it". Israeli newspapers published the photo under headlines such as "Terror in Diapers". and "Born to Kill". The image was also shown on Israeli television.

A senior adviser to Israeli Prime Minister Ariel Sharon said, "The photograph of the baby suicide bomber symbolizes the incitement and hatred which the Palestinian leadership have been using to brainwash an entire generation of Palestinian children who have, unfortunately, taken in this message like mother's milk".

Saeb Erekat, a Palestinian negotiator and cabinet minister said, "These are lies that they use to cover their own crimes, the murder of our children ... This week alone, six children were killed at the hands of Israeli forces".

The photo was obtained by the IDF from a family photo album, and only used in public diplomacy by Israel, there was no suggestion that photo had been used in any Palestinian media or any other organized public communications by Palestinians. Palestinian officials dismissed it as a propaganda trick, Haaretz reported that a Palestinian journalist in the Hebron area said she did not believe the picture was a fake and expressed surprise at the furor it caused in Israel, noting: "I can find you many, many photos like this," she said. "Many kids imitate adults and wear toy masks and guns, especially during marches. It's not strange at all". She added that she had seen children as young as the one in the photograph wearing similar costumes: "In our society it happens a lot. It's a kind of phenomenon".

The BBC report said it was "not uncommon" for Palestinian children to dress as bombers, but did not give other examples. Other photos of Palestinian children dressed up as militants, but not suicide bombers, were published in the same BBC report, including a photo of two boys wearing militant insignia and holding (what looked like) guns, captioned: "The militants are heroes for many Palestinian children". Children on both sides of the conflict see combatants from their own side as "heroes" and dress up as them. In 2024 (during the Gaza war) the most popular Purim costume for children in Israel was an IDF soldier. The Jerusalem Post reported a "trend towards choosing real-life heroes over fictional ones" to dress up as for Purim. The IDF costumes were controversial in the Jewish diaspora.

== International opinions ==
=== Human rights organizations ===
According to Human Rights Watch, "Major Palestinian armed groups, including Al-Aqsa Martyrs Brigade, the Popular Front for the Liberation of Palestine, Islamic Jihad, and Hamas, have publicly disavowed the use of children in military operations, but those stated policies have not always been implemented. Some leaders, including representatives of Islamic Jihad and Hamas, have said that they consider children of 16 to be adults. International law defines a child as any person under the age of eighteen. [...] Israeli government policy in the Occupied Territories defines Palestinians under the age of 16 as minors while Israeli children in the same territories are considered minors until they reach the age of 18".

=== Views of foreign academics ===
According to emeritus professor of psychiatry at the University of Virginia School of Medicine Vamik Volkan, "Most suicide bombers in the Middle East are chosen as teenagers, "educated", and then sent off to perform their duty when they are in their late teens or early to mid-twenties. The "education" is most effective when religious elements of the large-group identity are provided as solutions for the personal sense of helplessness, shame, and humiliation". Volkan gives the examples of beatings, torture, or the loss of a parent as typical humiliating events that might make a young person more susceptible to recruitment for suicide terrorism.

Anne Speckhard, an academic who studies Psychiatry at Georgetown University and Vesalius College, says there is a "cult of martyrdom" in Palestinian society.

== See also ==
- List of Palestinian militant groups suicide attacks
- Assassination of Benazir Bhutto in 2007 by a 15-year-old suicide bomber.
- Shaheed Benazir Bhutto
- The Making of a Martyr
- Female suicide bomber
- List of Lehi operations § Rejected plans
- Military use of children
- Palestinian political violence
- Human rights in the Palestinian National Authority
- Human rights violations against Palestinians by Israel
- Use of child soldiers in the Houthi insurgency in Yemen
- Asymmetric warfare
- Operation Samson
- Mechina – Israeli educational institution
