= Operation Defensive Shield =

2002 Israeli military operation

- Part of the Second Intifada
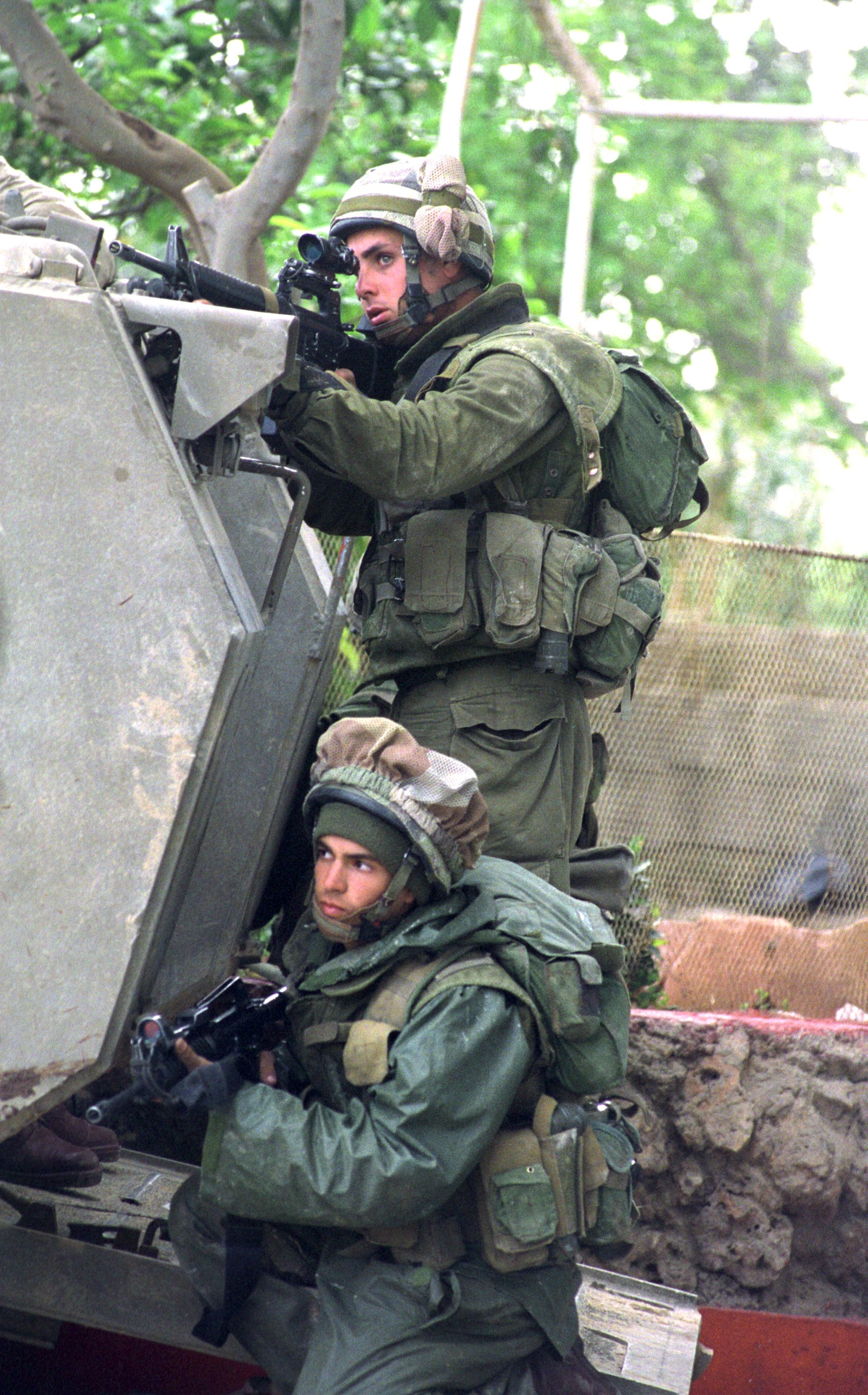
- Israeli soldiers taking cover behind an M113 APC in Qalqilya, April 2002
Date	March 29 – May 10, 2002
Location	Israeli-occupied West Bank (Palestinian territories)
Result	Inconclusive
Territorial changes	Israeli forces withdraw from the Palestinian enclaves in the West Bank; Temporary drop in Palestinian attacks; Second Intifada continues until 2005

Belligerents
Israel	Palestinian Authority; Fatah; Hamas; Palestinian Islamic Jihad

Commanders and leaders
(Israel) Ariel Sharon (Israel) Shaul Mofaz (Israel) Yitzhak Eitan	(Palestine) Yasser Arafat (Palestine) Mahmoud Tawalbe †

Units involved
Israel Defense Forces; Israeli Ground Forces; Israeli Air Force	Palestinian Security Services; Palestinian National Security Forces; (Fatah) Al-Aqsa Martyrs' Brigades; (Fatah) Tanzim; (Hamas) Al-Qassam Brigades; Al-Quds Brigades

Strength
20,000 soldiers	10,000 fighters

Casualties and losses
30 soldiers killed 127 soldiers wounded	497 killed (per UN reports); 1,447 wounded 7,000 detained
- Cities in the West Bank that saw major combat during Operation Defensive Shield

Operation Defensive Shield (Hebrew: מִבְצָע חוֹמַת מָגֵן Mīvtzāh Ḥōmat Māgēn) was a 2002 Israeli military operation in the Israeli-occupied West Bank during the Second Intifada. Lasting for just over a month, it was the largest combat operation in the territory since the 1967 Arab–Israeli War.

The operation began with an Israeli incursion into Ramallah, where Yasser Arafat was placed under siege at his compound. This was followed by successive incursions into the six largest West Bank cities and their surrounding localities. Israel's military moved into Tulkarm and Qalqilya on April 1, into Bethlehem on April 2, and into Jenin and Nablus on April 3. From April 3 to 21, Israel enforced strict curfews on the Palestinian populace of the West Bank and restricted movements of international personnel, including prohibiting entry to humanitarian and medical personnel and human rights monitors and journalists.

In May 2002, Israel withdrew from Palestinian cities in the West Bank, but maintained cordons of troops around certain towns and villages, and also continued carrying out raids on Palestinian-populated areas.

According to a report by the United Nations: "Combatants on both sides conducted themselves in ways that, at times, placed civilians in harm's way. Much of the fighting during Operation Defensive Shield occurred in areas heavily populated by civilians and in many cases heavy weaponry was used."

== Background ==
The Israeli–Palestinian conflict escalated during the Second Intifada. In January and February 2002, 71 people were killed on all sides during attacks from Palestinian terrorists and the Israeli army. March and April 2002 saw a dramatic increase in attacks against Israelis by Palestinian militants such as Hamas, Islamic Jihad and the Fatah-affiliated Al-Aqsa Martyrs' Brigades. In addition to numerous shooting and grenade attacks, fifteen suicide bombings were carried out in March, an average of one suicide bombing every two days. March 2002 became known in Israel as "Black March". The large number of attacks severely disrupted daily life in Israel.

The first wave of Israeli incursions took place between 27 February and 14 March. Following nine attacks by Palestinian militants between March 2–5, the Israeli cabinet decided to massively expand its military activity against these groups. On March 5, while talking with reporters in the Knesset cafeteria, Israeli Prime Minister Ariel Sharon, pointing to the bloodiest week against Israelis since the start of the Second Intifada, explained the cabinet's decision: "The Palestinians must be hit, and it must be very painful. ... We must cause them losses, victims, so that they feel a heavy price."

Palestinian attacks continued, with suicide bombings on 9 March, 20 March, and 21 March. Shooting and grenade attacks also continued to occur in Israel and Israeli settlements. On 27 March, a suicide attack occurred in Netanya, where 30 people were killed in the Park Hotel while celebrating Passover. The event became known as the Passover massacre. The following day, a Palestinian gunman infiltrated the Israeli settlement of Elon Moreh and killed four members of the same family.

On March 29, the Israeli government announced Operation Defensive Shield, terming it a large-scale counter-terrorist offensive. The Israel Defense Forces (IDF) issued emergency call-up notices for 30,000 reserve soldiers, the largest call-up since the 1982 Lebanon War. The same day, two Israelis were stabbed in the Gaza settlement of Netzarim. A suicide bombing occurred the next day, and another one took place the day after that.

Overall, in March 2002, some 130 Israelis including approximately 100 noncombatants were killed in Palestinian attacks, while a total of 238 Palestinians including at least 83 noncombatants were killed in the same month by the IDF.

== Stated goals ==
The stated goals of the operation (as conveyed to the Israeli Knesset by Prime Minister Ariel Sharon on April 8, 2002) were:

to catch and arrest terrorists and, primarily, their dispatchers and those who finance and support them; to confiscate weapons intended to be used against Israeli citizens; to expose and destroy facilities and explosives, laboratories, weapons production factories and secret installations. The orders are clear: target and paralyze anyone who takes up weapons and tries to oppose our troops, resists them or endangers them—and to avoid harming the civilian population.

IDF officers also noted that incursions would force Palestinian militants "to exert their energy by defending their homes in the camps instead of by plotting attacks on Israelis." The Palestinian attachment to the UN report on Operation Defensive Shield challenged the validity of the Israeli claim that it was targeting "terrorists," noting that,

[...] the record shows clearly that the nature of the actions taken, the amount of harm inflicted on the population and the practical results prove completely different political goals [...] the Israeli occupying forces have consistently targeted the Palestinian police and security forces, instead of "terrorists", and have consistently tried to destroy the Palestinian Authority and declared it an "enemy", instead of groups hostile to peace in the Middle East.

== Operation ==
Operation Defensive Shield was announced on March 29, but it is widely assumed preparations began nearly a month before. In early April, the IDF was conducting major military operations inside all Palestinian cities, but the majority of the fighting centered on Bethlehem, Jenin, Nablus, and Ramallah. Over 20,000 Israeli reservists were activated during the conflict.

=== Jenin ===
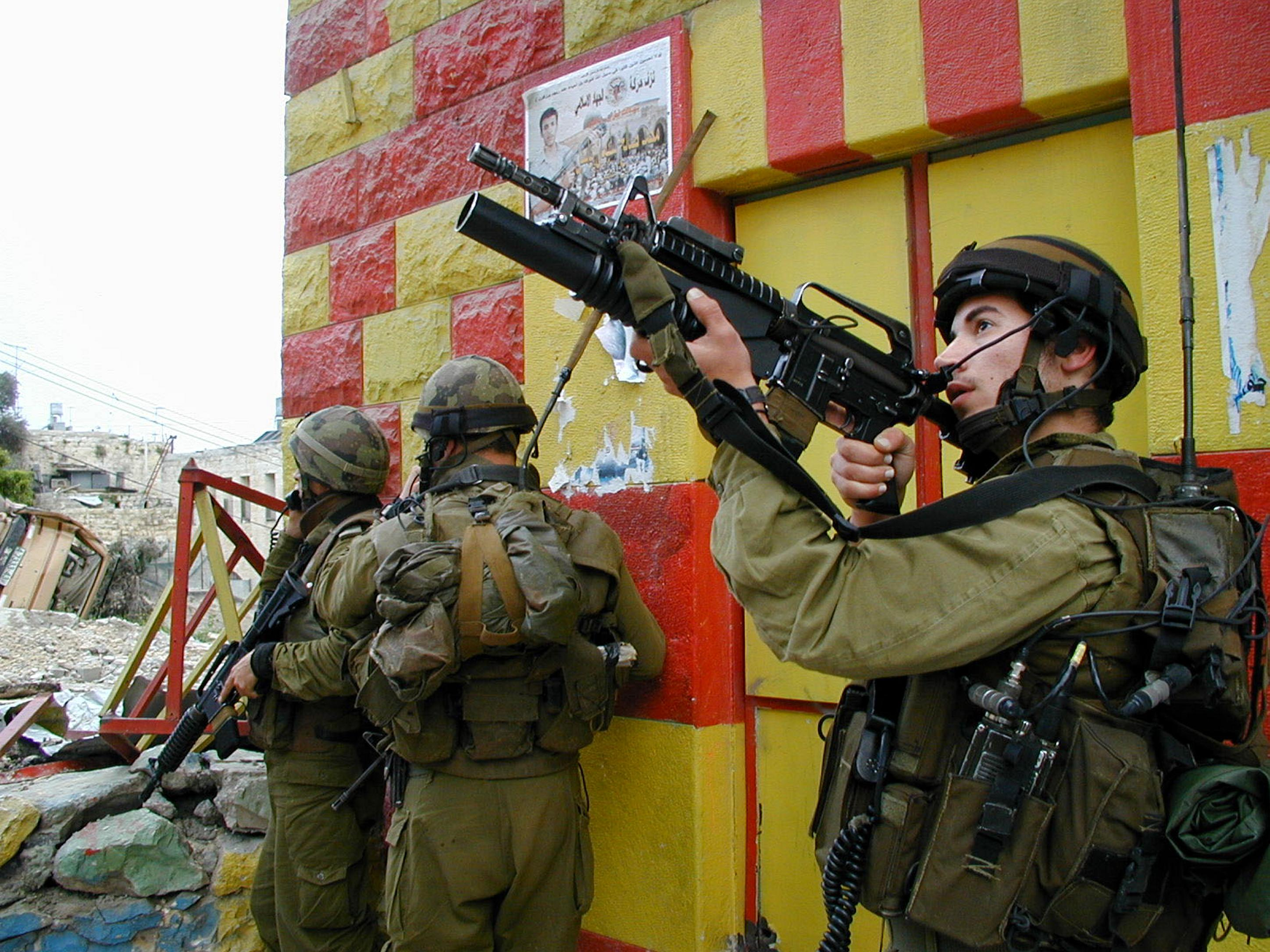
Israeli soldiers in Jenin

According to Israeli authorities, Jenin became a central base for terror groups and terror attacks mounted by several organizations, including Palestinian Islamic Jihad, Al-Aqsa Martyrs Brigades, and Hamas. The IDF spokesman attributed 23 of the 60 suicide bombers that attacked Israel in 2002 to Palestinians from Jenin.

On April 2, more than 1,000 IDF soldiers entered the camp, calling civilians and non-combatants to leave. An estimated 13,000 Palestinians were housed in Jenin prior to the operation.

The operation was led by the 5th Infantry Brigade, which had not yet been trained in close-quarters combat. During a series of sweeps, the Israeli military claimed the entire camp was booby-trapped. At least 2,000 bombs and booby traps were planted throughout the camp. In response to the discovery, the Israelis dispatched combat bulldozers to detonate any bombs that were placed in the streets.

Israeli commanders were still not confident that soldiers would be safe from booby traps and improvised explosive devices (IEDs). A rapid ground attack would clearly be costly in IDF lives, but political pressure from the United States and elsewhere required a rapid end to the fighting. Former defense minister Shaul Mofaz promised combat-operations would be over by April 6, but that was clearly impossible. The IDF slowly advanced into the city, encountering fierce resistance. Most of the fighting was conducted by infantry fighting house-to-house, while armored bulldozers were used to clear away booby traps and IEDs. Air support was limited to helicopter gunships firing wire-guided missiles. Palestinian commander Mahmoud Tawalbe was killed during the battle. According to a British military expert, he was killed by an Israeli bulldozer, while the Palestinians claimed that blew himself up to collapse a house on Israeli soldiers.

On the third day of operations, an IDF unit wandered into a Palestinian ambush. Thirteen Israeli soldiers were killed and three of the bodies were captured before a Shayetet 13 naval commando unit could retrieve them.

After the ambush, the Israeli military developed a tactic that allowed units to advance farther and more safely into the camps. Israeli commanders would send an armored bulldozer to ram the corner of a house, creating a hole. An IDF Achzarit would then enter the hole, allowing troops to clear the house without going through booby-trapped doors. Palestinian resistance was halted following the adoption of the bulldozer method, and most residents of the Hawashin neighborhood surrendered before it was leveled. Palestinian commander Hazem Qabha refused to surrender and was killed.

Throughout the Battle of Jenin, and for a few days afterwards, the city and its refugee camp were under total closure. There was much concern at the time about possible human rights violations occurring in the camp. Allegations of a massacre in Jenin were spread by Palestinians in order to create pressure on Israel to halt the operation. Claims of complete destruction of the Jenin refugee camp, a massacre of 500 civilians, and mass graves being dug by Israeli soldiers were proven false after a United Nations investigation. Reports of a large-scale massacre were found to be untrue, a result of confusion resulting from the Israeli refusal to allow entry to outside observers, and/or Palestinian media manipulation.

Ultimately, the Jenin incursion resulted in the deaths of 52 Palestinians. According to Israel, five were civilians and the rest were militants. Human Rights Watch reported that 27 militants and 22 civilians, as well as three unidentified persons, had been killed, based mostly on witness interviews. Israeli losses totalled 23 soldiers killed and 75 wounded.

=== Nablus ===
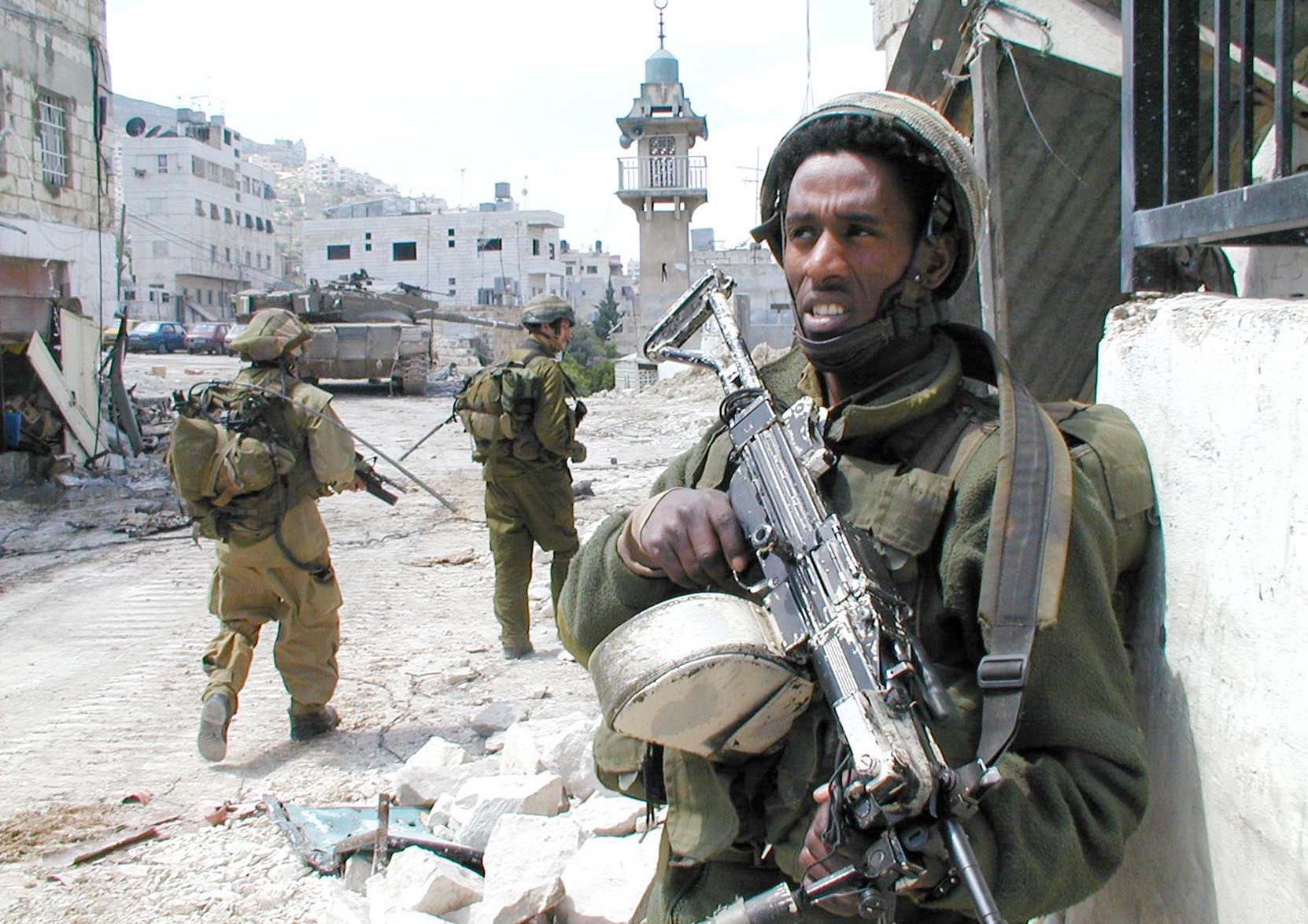
Israeli soldiers in Nablus

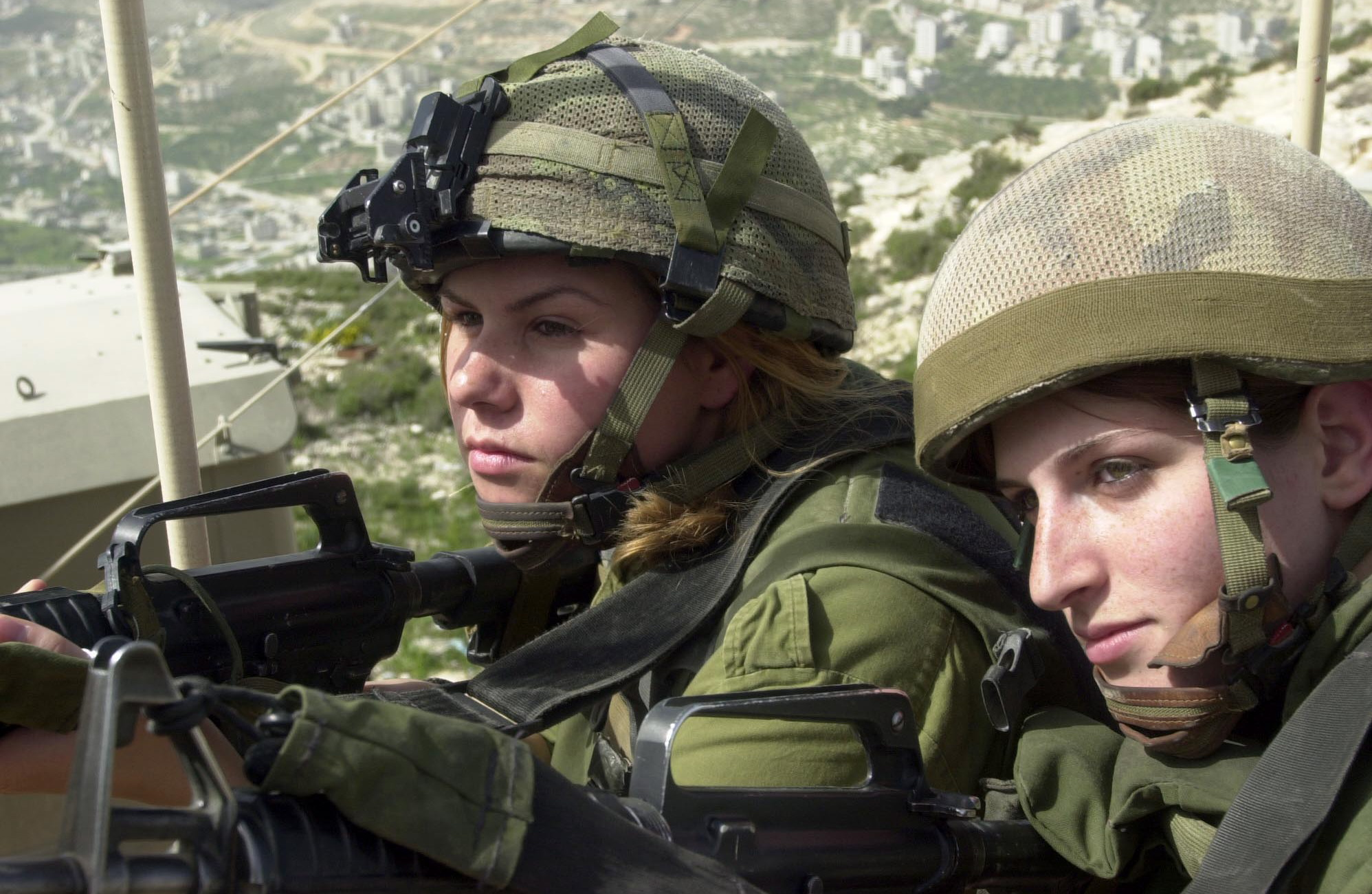
Israeli paratroopers serving in Nablus as part of Operation Defensive Shield

The IDF launched an incursion into Nablus with two regular infantry brigades and one reserve armored brigade. The city was estimated to have held over 8,000 Palestinian militants, in addition to Palestinian security forces. Israeli forces quickly occupied most of the city. Clashes took place around refugee camps, and Israeli attack helicopters fired rockets at Palestinian positions in the main square and neighboring streets. The main attack focused on the Nablus Casbah. The Golani Brigade entered the Casbah, engaging the Palestinians in heavy street combat and using armored bulldozers and Achzarit APCs to clear away barricades. Many militants withdrew to the western part of the city, where they were attacked by the Paratroopers Brigade. Troops gradually moved into the city by destroying walls within houses to get into the next house (known as mouse-holing/Rhizome Manoeuvre), in order to avoid booby-trapped doors and road-side bombs. The paratroopers advanced by sending several small units to take over houses at the same time and confuse the Palestinians, and relied heavily on sniper units. Palestinian militants often exposed their positions by firing at Israeli forces in another direction. During the battle over 70 Palestinian militants were killed, while the IDF lost one officer to friendly fire. The Palestinians surrendered on April 8.

Nablus was placed under curfew on April 4, as the battle was beginning. The city remained under curfew until April 22. During the operation, the IDF arrested over 100 Palestinians and discovered several explosives laboratories. High-ranking wanted persons fled east to Tubas, and were arrested a week later.

=== Bethlehem ===
IDF forces including the Jerusalemite Reserve Infantry Brigade entered Jerusalem with infantry, warplanes, and tanks while a special forces Shaldag Unit targeted the Church of the Nativity to deny it to the people of Bethlehem as a place of refuge as it had been in the past. In response to the IDF offensive hundreds of Bethelemites including Bethlehem's Governor sought refuge in the church, the helicopters of the Shaldag unit arriving half an hour too late.

On April 3 the IDF laid siege to the church surrounding it with an elite paratrooper brigade specializing in sniper operations who used tactics including carrying out simulated attacks. The Vatican's top foreign policy expert Archbishop Jean-Louis Taura stated that while the Palestinians have joined the Vatican in bilateral agreements where they have undertaken to respect and maintain the status quo regarding Christian holy places and the rights of Christian communities, "to explain the gravity of the current situation, let me begin with the fact that the occupation of the holy places by armed men is a violation of a long tradition of law that dates back to the Ottoman era. Never before have they been occupied – for such a lengthy time – by armed men." For five weeks the Israelis held the city and church under curfew, with periodic breaks, continuing the siege on the church. Israeli snipers were given orders to shoot anyone in the church carrying a gun on sight, seriously wounding an Armenian monk who the IDF said looked armed, and killing the mentally impaired church bell-ringer who was shot as he left to ring the bells as he had done for three decades. He was left to die, bleeding in the square for hours. Six other men were killed by the IDF during the siege. On May 10 the siege ended, with a deal seeing some militants deported to the Gaza Strip, and the rest exiled to Cyprus.

=== Ramallah ===
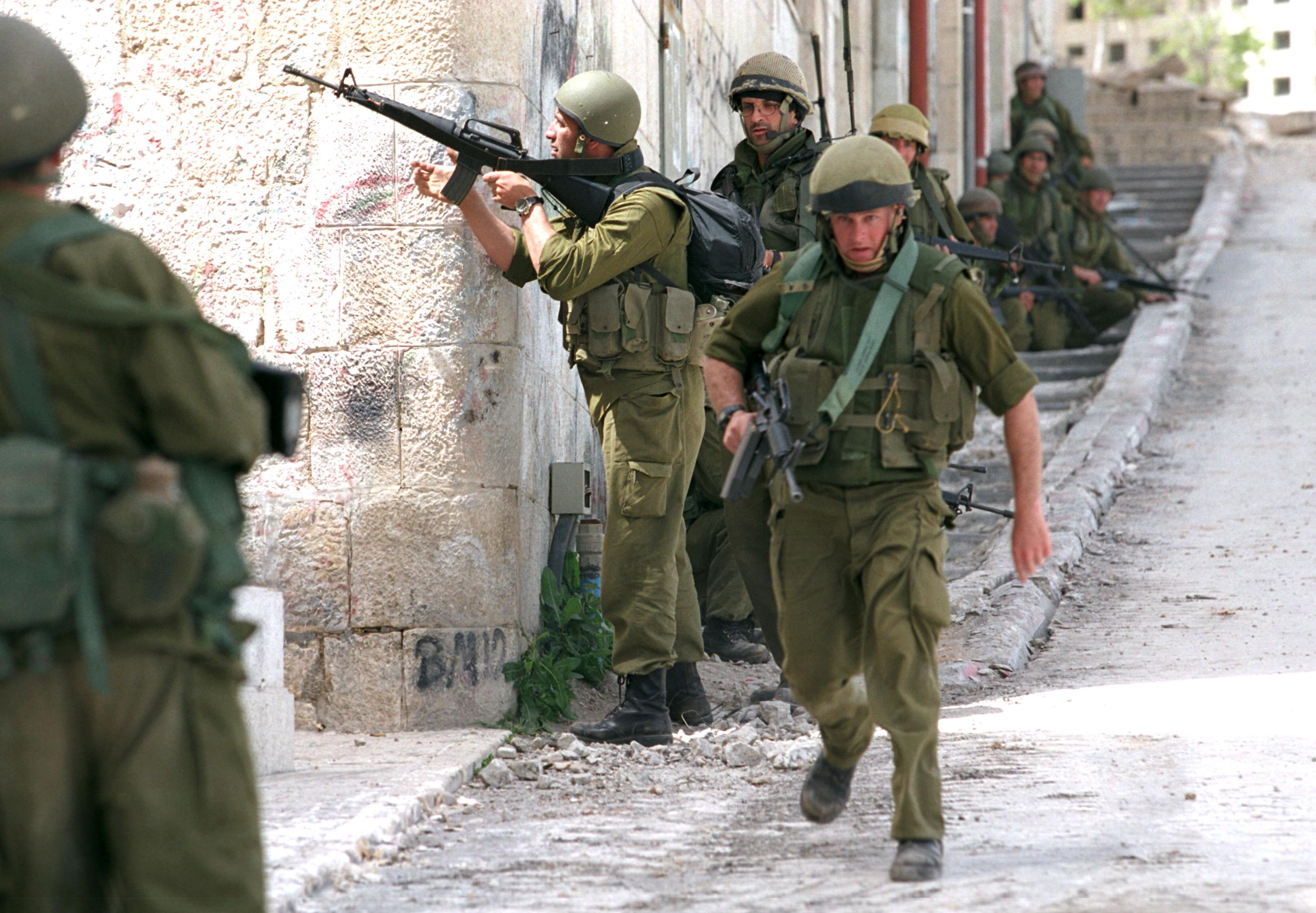
Israeli soldiers in Ramallah

IDF infantry and armor entered Ramallah on March 29 and entered the Mukataa, Yasser Arafat's presidential compound. The Israelis forced their way through the compound's perimeter and quickly occupied it. Arafat was given refuge in a few of the compound's rooms, along with assorted advisors, security personnel and journalists. In an effort to isolate Arafat physically and diplomatically, access to the compound was restricted, and Arafat was not allowed to leave. The IDF occupied the city after several hours of street fighting in which some 30 Palestinians were killed. Ramallah was then placed under a tight curfew as soldiers conducted searches and made arrests. The IDF arrested more than 700 people, among them Marwan Barghouti, a top Palestinian militant leader suspected of directing numerous suicide bombings and other attacks against Israelis. Barghouti was later tried in Israel and sentenced to life imprisonment. The day after Marwan Barghouti's arrest, Taleb Barghouti was arrested.

On April 2, Israeli tanks and APCs surrounded the headquarters of the Preventive Security Force in nearby Beitunia as Israeli helicopter gunships flew overhead. Hundreds of heavily armed police officers and prisoners wanted by Israel were inside. Israeli troops used loudspeakers to announce that the compound's four buildings were to be destroyed and demand that everyone inside step out. Hundreds of police officers and fugitives emerged from the compound and surrendered to the Israeli army, and the facility was damaged by rockets. The Israelis extensively searched the facility and uncovered numerous incriminating documents, including a plan to recruit female Israeli soldiers as spies. Weapons stolen from the IDF were also discovered.

The Israelis forced the hundreds of policemen and fugitives who surrendered to strip naked, fearing that some were armed or packed with explosives. They were then given jumpsuits, loaded onto buses and taken to Ofer Prison. Shin Bet asked Jibril Rajoub, head of the Preventive Security Force, to point out which men were police officers and which were fugitives. Rajoub instead identified his policemen as fugitives and the fugitives as policemen, and the fugitives were all released. Shin Bet retaliated by releasing an official account that branded Rajoub as a traitor for turning over the fugitives in a CIA-brokered deal, costing Rajoub his job.

The UN report on the subject noted: "It was not only the Palestinian people whose movement was restricted during Operation Defensive Shield. In many instances, humanitarian workers were not able to reach people in need to assess conditions and deliver necessary assistance because of the sealing of cities, refugee camps and villages during the operation. There were also cases of Israeli forces not respecting the neutrality of medical and humanitarian workers and attacking ambulances."

In reply to these complaints, the IDF stated that the curfew was placed in order to prevent civilians from being caught in gunfights and getting hurt. Palestinian ambulances were stopped for checks following the discovery of an explosive belt in a Red Crescent ambulance.

=== Tulkarm ===
IDF Reserve Paratroop Battalion 55 entered Tulkarm with armored support. Palestinian militants abandoned their weapons and melted into the local population, and nine were killed by the IDF. A Tegart fort that had served as their headquarters was destroyed by an Israeli airstrike. The IDF also raided nearby villages, arresting hundreds of wanted men.

=== Hebron ===
On April 4, gendarmes from an Israel Border Police undercover unit surrounded a house in Hebron where a member of the Al-Aqsa Martyrs' Brigades who supplied weapons to militants was holed up, along with his brother. The gendarmes demanded that the two men surrender. Shots were fired at the troops, killing one of the gendarmes. After a gun battle lasting several hours, troops stormed the house, discovering the suspect's wounded brother. The arms merchant was found to have fled.

=== European Union reaction ===
Spanish Foreign Minister Josep Piqué, whose country held the EU Presidency, said that "sanctions against Israel are a possible scenario", and that EU states were discussing the possibility, with some reluctant and others wanting to impose sanctions. Belgian Foreign Minister Louis Michel also said that the EU could rethink its trade relations with Israel. The European Parliament passed a non-binding resolution calling for economic sanctions on Israel, an arms embargo on both parties, and for the European Union to "suspend immediately" its trade and cooperation agreement with Israel. It condemned the "military escalation pursued by the Sharon government" and the "oppression of the Palestinian civilian population by the Israeli army", while also condemning suicide bombings. According to Yediot Aharonot, Israel's refusal to allow Spanish EU officials Javier Solana and Josep Piqué into the Mukataa to meet with Yasser Arafat, while allowing American envoy Anthony Zinni to enter, was the "straw that broke the camel's back". The resolution was passed by a vote of 269 to 208, with 22 abstentions.

== Casualties ==
During the fighting, 497 Palestinians were killed and 1,447 were wounded, according to a United Nations investigation, while 30 Israeli soldiers were killed and 127 were wounded. However, the human rights group B'Tselem only registered 240 Palestinians killed by Israeli security forces in the West Bank during the period in which the operation took place. Approximately 7,000 Palestinians were detained by Israel including 396 wanted suspects.

The World Bank estimated that over $361 million worth of damage was caused to Palestinian infrastructure and institutions, $158 million of which came from the aerial bombardment and destruction of houses in Nablus and Jenin.

== Strategic outcome ==
The effects of Operation Defensive Shield, as recorded by the Israeli Intelligence and Terrorism Information Center, were an initial drop in half (46 percent) in the number of suicide bombings – from 22 in February–March to 12 in April–May – and a 70 percent drop in executed attacks between the first half of 2002 and the second half (43 January–June, 13 July–December). While 2003 had a total of 25 executed suicide bombings in comparison to 56 in 2002, the main difference was the number of attacks which did not come to realization (184) either due to Israeli interception or problems in the execution. 2003 also saw a 35 percent drop in the number of fatalities from 220 deaths in 2002 to 142 deaths resulting from suicide bombings.

Beverly Milton-Edwards, Professor of Politics at Queen's University in Belfast, writes that while aspects of Palestinian terrorism were reduced after the operation, Israel's objective of ending the Al-Aqsa Intifada remained unmet. Israeli destruction of institutions belonging to the Palestinian Authority (PA) and the "emasculation" of the PA and its President, Yasser Arafat, opened a vacuum in the social and welfare system that was rapidly filled by the Hamas, whose popularity grew. Milton-Edwards concludes that, "The unequivocal victory [sought by Israel] eventually remained elusive and the Israelis and Palestinians resumed a variety of forms of low intensity warfare with each other."

== Fact-finding and criticism ==
=== UN fact-finding mission ===
A UN fact-finding mission was established under UN Security Council Resolution 1405 (April 19, 2002) into Operation Defensive Shield following Palestinian charges that a massacre had occurred in Jenin, which later proved to be false. In its attachment to the UN report the Palestinian Authority decried Israel's "culture of impunity" and called for "an international presence to monitor compliance with international humanitarian law, to help in providing protection to Palestinian civilians and to help the parties to implement agreements reached."

A report of the European Union attached in the report stated, "The massive destruction, especially at the centre of the refugee camp, to which all heads of mission in Jerusalem and Ramallah can testify, shows that the site had undergone an indiscriminate use of force, that goes well beyond that of a battlefield."

The report states that there were numerous reports of the IDF using Palestinians as human shields. Israel denied the allegations.

=== Human rights groups ===
Human Rights Watch determined that "Israeli forces committed serious violations of international humanitarian law, some amounting prima facie to war crimes."

Amnesty International reported that war crimes occurred in the Jenin refugee camp and in Nablus, including: unlawful killings; a failure to ensure medical or humanitarian relief; demolition of houses and property occurred (sometime with civilians still inside); water and electricity supplies to civilians were cut; torture or other cruel, inhuman or degrading treatment in arbitrary detention occurred; and Palestinians civilians were used for military operations or as "human shields." According to Amnesty, "the IDF acted as though the main aim was to punish all Palestinians."

=== Destruction of infrastructure and property ===
Scholars have noted "the Israeli military systematically destroy[ing] West Bank infrastructure, including roads, water-treatment and power-generating plants, and telecommunications facilities, as well as official database and documents" during the Operation.

==== Destruction of Palestinian Authority property ====
The UN report noted that "United Nations agencies and other international agencies, when allowed into Ramallah and other Palestinian cities, documented extensive physical damage to Palestinian Authority civilian property. That damage included the destruction of office equipment, such as computers and photocopying machines, that did not appear to be related to military objectives. While denying that such destruction was systematic, the Israeli Defence Forces have admitted that their personnel engaged in some acts of vandalism, and are carrying out some related prosecutions."

Cheryl Rubenberg writes that data and records held by Palestinian civilian institutions were systematically destroyed by the IDF; among the institutions affected were the Palestinian Central Bureau of Statistics (PCBS), the Palestinian Authority's Ministries of Culture, Education and Health, and the Palestine International Bank.

Amira Hass, an Israeli reporter for Haaretz, criticized the IDF for targeting computer files and printed records, dubbing the offensive "Operation Destroy the Data". She wrote that "this was not a mission to search and destroy the terrorist infrastructure. ... There was a decision made to vandalize the civic, administrative, cultural infrastructure developed by Palestinian society".

==== Destruction of non-governmental property ====
Large-scale destruction was reported of properties of NGOs, media, universities, cultural centers, and other institutions. Complete libraries and archives, including video and music archives, as well as equipment were looted, vandalized and destroyed. Also demolition of shops and a religious compound were reported.

=== Jenin massacre allegations ===
A great deal of the media attention to Operation Defensive Shield centered around Palestinians claims of a large-scale massacre in Jenin. Palestinian cabinet minister Saeb Erekat was widely quoted by the press as saying there were 500 massacred Palestinians in the Israeli assault on Jenin.

Human Rights Watch found no evidence to sustain claims of massacres or large-scale extrajudicial executions by the IDF in Jenin refugee camp. However, many of the civilian deaths documented amounted to unlawful or willful killings by the IDF according to Human Rights Watch. Many others could have been avoided if the IDF had taken proper precautions to protect civilian life during its military operation, as required by international humanitarian law. Among the civilian deaths were those of Kamal Zgheir, a 57-year-old man who was shot and run over by a tank on a major road outside the camp on April 10, even though he had a white flag attached to his wheelchair; 58-year-old Mariam Wishahi, killed by a missile in her home on April 6 just hours after her unarmed son was shot in the street; Jamal Fayid, a 37-year-old paralyzed man who was crushed in the rubble of his home on April 7 despite his family's pleas to be allowed to remove him; and fourteen-year-old Faris Zaiban, who was killed by fire from an IDF armored car as he went to buy groceries when the IDF-imposed curfew was temporarily lifted on April 11. Human Rights Watch stated that of at least 52 Palestinians were killed, at least 27 were suspected to have been armed Palestinian militants.

Multiple deaths were also caused by refusal (whether enforced by militia groups or voluntary is disputed) of Palestinian families to leave their houses, of which specific bulldozers, clearing the way for operations, were not alerted of on a house-to-house basis (See Israel–Gaza war 2008–2009 for similar issues; where IDF warnings were continually issued that specific houses carrying munitions were to be targeted, with Hamas response of forcing families to remain inside their houses.)

Initially Israel welcomed an investigation, announcing that it would cooperate fully with the Secretary General's fact-finding effort. According to the United Jewish Communities, Israel made a number of points regarding the team's methodology, in order to "safeguard the impartiality of its work." However, Israeli government receptivity to cooperating with the UN fact-finding mission decreased when the Secretary-General of the United Nations, Kofi Annan, did not appoint a predominantly technical team with specialized military and forensic expertise, but rather political-administrative figures without such specialized skills (including Cornelio Sommaruga, controversial for previous "Red Swastika" remarks), and after Palestinian officials reduced the casualty toll in Jenin on May 1, 2002 to be between 50 and 60 deaths while Israel maintained there were only seven or eight civilian casualties. The charges of a massacre which had sparked demands for a U.N. investigation, had now been dropped. Kofi Annan disbanded the UN fact-finding team in Jenin supposed to determine whether a massacre had taken place with the comment that "[c]learly the full cooperation of both sides was a precondition for this, as was a visit to the area itself to see the Jenin refugee camp at first hand and to gather information. This is why the Secretariat engaged in a thorough clarification process with the Israeli delegation."

In 2002, Mohammad Bakri, a prominent Arab actor and Israeli citizen, directed and produced a documentary Jenin, Jenin, to portray "the Palestinian truth" about the Battle of Jenin. In the documentary Bakri propagates that indeed a massacre of civilians occurred in Jenin. A French Jewish film maker, Pierre Rehov, also directed a documentary on what happened in Jenin during Defensive Shield. His film, The Road to Jenin, was produced to counter the claims of a massacre, and to counter the narrative of Mohammad Bakri. CAMERA made a review of the two documentary films. According to the review, Bakri has admitted to shortening his film by 25 min in the wake of criticism.

==== Reported first-hand allegations ====
David Rohde of The New York Times on the April 16 reported:

Saed Dabayeh, who said he stayed in the camp through the fighting, led a group of reporters to a pile of rubble where he said he watched from his bedroom window as Israeli soldiers buried 10 bodies. "There was a hole here where they buried bodies," he said. "And then they collapsed a house on top of it." The Palestinian accounts could not be verified. "The smell of decomposing bodies hung over at least six heaps of rubble today, and weeks of excavation may be needed before an accurate death toll can be made."

Stewart Bell of the National Post on the April 15 reported that Ahmed Tibi, an Arab member of the Israeli Knesset, said he had met hundreds of Palestinians displaced by what he termed the "massacre" in Jenin. According to Tibi, "Everyone has a tragedy, about executions they saw, about their whole family that was killed, about the most tangible concern—where is my family?" Bell reported that Jenin's population recounted "vivid accounts" of fighting and homes being demolished but first-hand accounts of massacres was scarce. One such rumor was a grocery store owner near Jenin who spoke of seeing Israeli troops using a refrigerated truck to hold the bodies of massacred Palestinians, which he said was still parked on a nearby hill. He refused to elaborate out of fear from "collaborators." Bell reported that a National Post reporter inspected the truck and found that it contained apples and other food for the Israeli soldiers.

== See also ==
- List of invasions in the 21st century
- 2024 Israeli military operation in the West Bank, the largest one since Operation Defense Shield

== Bibliography ==
- Milton-Edwards, Beverley (2008). The Israeli-Palestinian Conflict: A People's War (Illustrated ed.). Taylor & Francis. ISBN 978-0-415-41043-4.
- Rubenberg, Cheryl (2003). The Palestinians: in search of a just peace (Illustrated ed.). Lynne Rienner Publishers. ISBN 978-1-58826-225-7.
