= Hussam Abdo =

Palestinian militant (born 1990)

Hussam Muhammad Bilal Abdo (Arabic: حسام محمد بلال عبده; born 24 February 1990) is a Palestinian from the Masahiya area of Nablus, who, as a teenager, made international headlines on 24 March 2004, when he entered the Hawara Checkpoint in the West Bank, with eight kilos (18 lbs) of explosives strapped to his body as part of a suicide attack attempt.

== The incident ==
Abdo, then reportedly aged 14, approached the checkpoint running towards the soldiers, wearing 8 kilograms (18 lbs) of explosives on a vest with the activation switch in his hands. When the Israeli soldiers noticed something suspicious about the boy, they directed their weapons at him and he became startled and raised his arms without detonating the belt. He was then ordered to raise his shirt and the explosives belt was discovered. After all the people were ordered to safety, a specialized Bomb disposal robot was sent to him with a pair of scissors, so that he could cut off the explosives, all the while telling soldiers that he did not want to die. He was then searched for more bombs but none were found and the bomb taken from Abdo's vest was later exploded at a safe area. The commanding officer at the checkpoint noted that it is possible that the boy tried to activate the explosive belt but that "it did not work".

Media reported that Abdo said he was offered 100 NIS and promised sex with the promised virgins and Israeli security forces added that in the inquiry it was found that Abdo was unpopular among his fellow students and that his friends would mock him. Fatah's military wing of Al-Aqsa Martyrs' Brigades from the Balata refugee camp in Nablus took responsibility for the sending of the boy.

When asked on Israeli television to give the reason for his attempted attack, Abdo said "because of the people". When this was repeated back to him in the form of a question, he responded, "they don't love me". He was then asked by a reporter if he also thought about paradise, and nodded his head. The Jerusalem Post quoted Hussam as saying his handlers told him that blowing himself up is the only chance he'd have at sex with 72 virgins in the Garden of Eden.

The Age reported that Hussam said, in an interview, that after years of bullying by classmates, he wanted to reach the paradise he had learned about in Islamic teachings.

== Interviews ==
In July 2004, the BBC was allowed an interview with Abdo in an Israeli jail in which he detailed the trail of mission. He said he was recruited by his friend Nasser, a 16-year-old classmate who approached him asking Abdo if he would find him a "martyr bomber", to which Abdo replied he'll do it. Abdo was then taken to Wael, a 21-year-old member of the Al-Aqsa Martyrs' Brigades who took him to a third militant who put the bomb belt on the boy and both took pictures of him. Abdo described his feelings towards the people who sent him as 'normal' and noted that one of them is also in prison and that they are friends. When asked about the reasons for the attack, Abdo stated it was because his friend was killed and also because he desired to be relieved of school.

In the documentary The Making of a Martyr, Abdo was interviewed a year and a half after his attempted suicide bombing. He expressed no remorse and in fact seemed closer to the terrorists with whom he was incarcerated. He regretted not being in an explosion and remembered his failed attempt with joy, saying "When they drove me to the checkpoint, I was giggling and jumping."

== Family report ==
Abdo's mother, Tamam, said "He's a small child who can't even look after himself. He's only 16 . . . He never had a happy childhood. He still hasn't seen anything in life. If he was over 18, that would have been possible, and I might even encourage him to do it. But it's impossible for a child his age to do it." Israeli media described Abdo as a "mentally challenged" boy while his brother, Hosni, said that Abdo "has the intelligence of a 12 year old." His family criticized the Israeli Defense Forces for "parading" the boy in front of international reporters. Abdo's uncle Khalil said that if he found out who sent his nephew out as a suicide bomber, he'd gladly kill the dispatcher himself.

== Media coverage ==
Abdo's story, and that of the child suicide bombing phenomenon in the Palestinian Territories, was captured in the award-winning documentary, The Making of A Martyr, by Brooke Goldstein and Alistair Leyland.

Husam was interviewed by Pierre Rehov for making of his documentary Suicide Killers where Rehov studies the psychopathology behind Muslim terrorism, and why some Muslim parents are willing to offer their children as martyrs.

According to Shafiq Masalha, a clinical psychologist who teaches at Tel Aviv University's education program, 15% of Palestinian children dream of becoming suicide bombers. According to Eyad Sarraj, Palestinian psychiatrist and director of the Gaza Community Mental Health Program, a survey his group made found that 36% of Palestinians over 12 aspired to die "a martyr's death" fighting Israel.

== See also ==
- Child suicide bombers in the Israeli-Palestinian conflict
- Islamist terrorism
