= Lawfare (disambiguation) =

Lawfare is a form of war consisting of the use of the legal system against an enemy. Lawfare may also refer to:

- Lawfare (website), an online multimedia publication about national security issues in the United States
- Lawfare Project, a litigation fund defending Jewish civil rights
