= Brooke Goldstein =

American human rights lawyer

- Education: McGill University (BA); Benjamin N. Cardozo School of Law (JD)
- Occupations: Founder and executive director of The Lawfare Project
- Notable work: The Making of a Martyr (2006 film); Lawfare: The War Against Free Speech (2011 book)

Brooke Goldstein is an American civil rights attorney and founder of the Lawfare Project.

== Early life and education ==
Goldstein was born and raised in Toronto, Ontario, Canada. Her grandfather was a commander in a unit of Polish partisans that fought against the Nazis. She is of Jewish descent. She graduated from McGill University and the Benjamin N. Cardozo School of Law.

== Career ==
=== The Making of a Martyr ===
CNN anchor Carol Costello described Goldstein in 2007 as "a woman on a mission" who traveled to the West Bank, "as a young law student," to film the 2006 documentary film The Making of a Martyr. Goldstein produced and directed the film about a Palestinian sixteen-year-old, Hussam Abdo, who was stopped at an Israeli border checkpoint when guards found live explosives wrapped around his body. Goldstein argues that Palestinian activists, by encouraging suicide bombing, abuse the rights of Palestinian children. Goldstein calls the use of children as suicide bombers, "the intentional murder of innocent children."

=== Children's Rights Institute ===
Continuing her work from the film, in 2007 Goldstein founded the Children's Rights Institute that describes itself as "a non-profit organization that tracks and legally combats violations of children's basic human rights, with a special focus on child suicide-homicide bombers, child soldiers, and the phenomenon of human shields."

=== Lawfare Project ===
Goldstein founded the Lawfare Project in 2010, an American nonprofit advocacy organization based in New York City.

Goldstein co-authored the 2011 book Lawfare: The War Against Free Speech: A First Amendment Guide for Reporting in an Age of Islamist Lawfare. The book offers advice to journalists about how to protect themselves against what Goldstein and Meyer describe as "'Islamist lawfare,' the use of the law as a weapon of war to silence and punish free speech about militant Islam, terrorism and its sources of financing."

Prior to the Lawfare Project, Goldstein worked for the Middle East Forum for two years, directing the organization's "Legal Project" program, "which arranges pro-bono and reduced rate counsel for people wrongfully sued for speaking about issues of national security," particularly terrorism and Islamic extremism.

=== End Jew Hatred ===
Goldstein founded advocacy organization End Jew Hatred in 2020. According to the New York Jewish Week in 2023, "End Jew Hatred doesn't publicize much about its structure or funding. It is not a registered nonprofit organization, and would not tell the New York Jewish Week its annual budget."

End Jew Hatred first drew attention that October for organizing a rally outside the New York Public Library to protest Mayor Bill de Blasio and Governor Andrew Cuomo for allegedly targeting Orthodox New Yorkers with public health restrictions. It has protested against the United Nations Relief & Works Agency for Palestine Refugees in the Near East (UNRWA) for alleged antisemitism.

In September 2024, End Jew Hatred, together with pro-Israel advocacy groups StopAntisemitism, StandWithUs and 2024 New Voices, organized an open letter urging the Biden administration to "protect and support" Israel and secure the release of hostages taken by Hamas in the Gaza war. The letter was signed by 62 artists and celebrities, including Chelsea Handler, Connie Britton, Andy Cohen, Mayim Bialik, Jennifer Jason Leigh, Patricia Heaton, Jill Zarin, Colton Underwood, Tara Strong, Baby Ariel and Montana Tucker.

=== Other activities ===
Goldstein has been a regular guest on Fox News, and has appeared on One America News Network and Newsmax. She is a term member at the Council on Foreign Relations. In 2016, Goldstein said, "There's no such thing as a Palestinian person", and tweeted, "Can I run the anti-anti-islamophobia department in the Trump administration?"

== Criticism of its activities ==
Goldstein’s advocacy has attracted criticism from both legal commentators and political opponents:

=== Benjamin Wittes's criticism ===
Goldstein’s activism has also attracted criticism. Benjamin Wittes, co-founder of the legal-policy publication Lawfare, described the Lawfare Project as a participant in “the culture wars over national security law” and argued that Goldstein’s approach sometimes crossed “lines of propriety” in its discussions of Islam and Muslims.

=== Leeds University Jewish Society ===
In 2012, the "Leeds University Jewish Society" withdrew an invitation for Goldstein to speak after students expressed concern that she was “too controversial,” including because of her association with Dutch politician Geert Wilders.

=== Lawsuit against the University of San Francisco ===
Dima Khalidi, director of Palestine Legal, criticized a lawsuit prepared by Goldstein’s Lawfare Project against San Francisco State University, arguing that it conflated criticism of Israeli policy with anti-Jewish discrimination. Khalidi also noted in the article's headline Goldstein's statement that Palestinians do not exist.

=== Blunder on Piers Morgan's show ===
In 2023, Goldstein accused Piers Morgan’s program of becoming a “propaganda tool for terrorism” because it hosted pro-Palestinian guests. During the televised discussion, Morgan challenged her to identify a guest who had expressed support for Hamas. According to Mediaite, Goldstein was unable to name one at that point. Wajahat Ali, another participant, criticized Goldstein by saying: “It’s pretty amazing that for a human rights lawyer, you really don’t seem to care much about human beings who happen to be Palestinians or Muslim or Arab.”

=== Campus protests ===
Goldstein’s characterization of campus protests has also attracted controversy. In 2024, she compared pro-Palestinian university protests to the Pearl Harbor attack and described them as an “illegal occupation”; student organizers rejected such portrayals as politically motivated.
