= The Road to Jenin =

- Directed by: Pierre Rehov
- Produced by: Pierre Rehov
- Release date: 2003
- Running time: 52 min
- Languages: English, Arabic, Hebrew and French with English subtitles

The Road to Jenin is a 2003 documentary directed by Pierre Rehov, a French-Israeli film director, whose documentaries mostly deal with the Middle East conflict. The Road to Jenin was produced to counter the Palestinian narrative in relation to the Battle of Jenin, between the Israeli army and Palestinian militants in April 2002, which drew Palestinian accounts of a "Jenin Massacre" (Arabic: مجزرة جنين). This film was also a response to Mohammad Bakri's 2002 film Jenin, Jenin.

== Content ==
Rehov's film begins some time before Israel's Operation Defensive Shield in Jenin with the Passover Seder bombing in Netanya, referred to in Israel as the Passover massacre, in which some 30 Israeli civilians were killed and 140 injured by a terrorist bomb.

Israel Channel One, which showed the film on its program Prime Time, said of it:

In the last section of the film, the film director, Pierre Rehov, travels to Jenin to interview Palestinians to get their side of the story - but Palestinian were caught in their own lies. For instance, a Palestinian journalist was caught staging a woman giving birth at a checkpoint. Or a Palestinian doctor shows a wing of the hospital that is supposed to have been destroyed by Tsahal. Despite the tense atmosphere and the constant danger, Tsahal soldiers assist Palestinians civilians. One soldier opens a can of food for an old lady who blesses him. A few other soldiers bring boxes of food to a Palestinian family and children. According to the UN, the Palestinians losses amount to 52, 40 of whom were fighters; whereas the Israeli Army, Tsahal, lost 23 soldiers. Not even close to the Palestinians' accusation of a massacre.

== Reception ==
Shirly Bahar found that the film (as well as the Israeli film Jenin: Reserves Diary, also from 2003) "dismiss Bakri's film, propagating the legitimacy of the IDF's operation in Jenin". Aviv Lavie of Haaretz called the film a "propagandistic counter-documentary".
