= Suicide Killers =

- DVD Cover
- Directed by: Pierre Rehov
- Starring: Chadhoorth Djawann; Dr. Jacinto Dumbal; Judge Dumbroso; Boaz Ganor; Dr. Eyad Sarraj
- Release date: August 25, 2006
- Running time: 80 minutes
- Country: United States
- Languages: English; French; Hebrew; Spanish; Arabic; Italian

Suicide Killers is a documentary film exploring the motivations of suicide bombers. It includes rare and never-before-seen interviews with family members of terrorists, widows of suicide bombers and surviving terrorists whose suicide attacks failed. Also included is footage of a suicide bomber as he prepares for his mission.

== See also ==
- Pierre Rehov - director of this movie
- Hussam Abdo - One of the child suicide bombers interviewed for this movie
- Islamist terrorism
