= Jenin, Jenin =

2002 Palestinian film

- Directed by: Mohammad Bakri
- Written by: Mohammad Bakri
- Produced by: Iyad Tahar Samoudi
- Edited by: Leandro Pantanella
- Release date: 2002
- Running time: 54 min
- Country: Palestinian territories
- Language: Arabic

Jenin, Jenin is a 2002 Palestinian documentary film directed by Mohammad Bakri. It portrays what the director called "the Palestinian truth" about the Battle of Jenin, between the Israeli army and Palestinians in April 2002.

== Background ==
A month after 18 Israelis had been killed in two separate attacks, and a few days after a suicide bombing in Netanya killed 30 and injured 140, the Israeli Defense Forces called up 30,000 reserve soldiers and launched Operation Defensive Shield.

During Operation Defensive Shield in April 2002, the Israel Defense Forces (IDF) invaded a Palestinian refugee camp in Jenin. The Israeli military refused to allow journalists and human rights organizations into the camp for "safety reasons" during the fighting, leading to a rapid cycle of rumors that a massacre had occurred. Jenin remained sealed for days after the invasion. Stories of civilians being buried alive in their homes as they were demolished, and of smoldering buildings covering crushed bodies, spread throughout the Arab world. Various casualty figures circulated, a senior Palestinian official accused Israel of massacring more than 500 people in the camp. UN fact-finding mission was not allowed by Israeli to enter Jenin.

Bakri participated in a nonviolent demonstration at a checkpoint during Israel's 2002 invasion of Jenin and was shocked when Israeli soldiers shot at the crowd, wounding a fellow actor standing next to him. He tells audiences that this experience inspired him to sneak into Jenin with a camera and ask residents, “What happened?” The result was the documentary Jenin Jenin, featuring a range of testimonies which suggested that a massacre had indeed occurred. Bakri gave voice to the perspective of Palestinians which would not reach the media due to the sealing of the city; as a result he chose not to interview Israeli officials for the film.

Human Rights Watch investigations found "no evidence to sustain claims of massacres or large-scale extrajudicial executions by the IDF in Jenin refugee camp" although they reported that "Israeli forces committed serious violations of international humanitarian law, some amounting prima facie to war crimes". The accusation of war crimes was repeated by Amnesty International. During the fighting in Jenin, Palestinian spokesmen, human rights organizations and foreign journalists accused Israel of conducting a civilian massacre. Israeli figures state that between 53 and 56 Palestinians were killed during the Israeli offensive, and apparently over half of them suspected to be armed combatants." Israel concurs that around 50 Palestinian died, but describes the event as a battle and blames civilian deaths on the close proximity of fighters and civilians. Twenty-three Israeli soldiers died.

The film title referenced Palestinian taxi drivers calling "Ramallah, Ramallah, Ramallah", or "Jenin! Jenin!" to Palestinian workers and travellers moving through Israeli checkpoints. Bakri dedicated the film to its producer, Iyad Samoudi, who was killed by Israeli soldiers, at al-Yamun in the Jenin Governorate of the West Bank, shortly after filming ended. The IDF said that Samoudi was an armed member of the al-Aqsa Martyrs' Brigades.

== Film content ==
The film has no narrator or guide and consists only of interviews with the inhabitants of Jenin edited by the producer.

== Controversy ==
=== Official positions ===
The title dedicated to Iyad Samoudi (armed member of the al-Aqsa Martyrs' Brigades according to IDF)

After a few screenings, the film was banned by the Israeli Film Ratings Board on the premise that it was libelous and might offend the public. In response Bakri contested the screening of a counter-response documentary The Road to Jenin, made by Pierre Rehov. The court rejected his request under the statement that regardless of the claim about the connection between the films, there is no legal basis to deny the screening of The Road to Jenin. The Tel Aviv and Jerusalem Cinematheques in Israel showed Bakri's film despite the ban.

Bakri took the ban to court and the Supreme Court of Israel overturned the decision. According to Supreme Court Judge Dalia Dorner: "The fact that the film includes lies is not enough to justify a ban,"; she implied that it is up to viewers to interpret what they see, citing the Maimonides quotation: "And with intellect shall distinguish the man, between the truth and the false." On appeal, the Supreme Court's ruling was stayed, but in August 2004 the Supreme Court reaffirmed the overturning of the ban, stating that the film board does not have "a monopoly over truth". Although the Supreme Court described the film as a "propagandistic lie," the ruling affirmed that choosing not to show 'both sides' of a story is not grounds for censorship.

=== Defamation lawsuit ===
Five Israeli reserve soldiers who served in Jenin filed suit in 2002 against Bakri for defamation arguing that the movie had sullied their good names. The plaintiffs were not mentioned in the film. The judge dismissed the case, ruling that while the film did in fact slander Israeli soldiers, the five Israeli soldiers were not personally slandered and thus had no standing to sue. The judge said in her verdict that Bakri had not shown "good faith", had brought no witnesses, and had not proved his claim that his charges were backed up by reports from human rights groups.

=== Public critics ===
Dr. David Zangen, who was the chief medical officer for the IDF in Jenin during Operation Defensive Shield (Head of Pediatric Endocrinology at Hadassah University Hospital in Jerusalem) issued a public statement titled Seven Lies About Jenin, giving his personal accounts about his visit to a private premiere screening of the film at the Jerusalem Cinematheque. In his statement, he cited 7 discrepancies he had hoped to raise in front of the viewers who denied him the possibility to get past the second point. He claimed Bakri has 'skillfully made a crude, albeit well-done, manipulation' that it is difficult not to be drawn into the created distorted picture; and that he was amazed that the audience was not willing to hear his own accounts, a person who had 'physically' been there. The version distributed in the English language is modified from the original movie, and some of the problematic scenes Zangen pointed out were omitted.

=== Defense ===
The Mohammad Bakri Defense Committee argues that "the importance of this case reaches beyond Bakri as an individual," amounting to repression of Palestinian self-expression. At a screening of his latest film in New York, a disturbed audience member confronted Bakri with accusations that Jenin, Jenin exaggerated the atrocities of the invasion presented a one-sided view, and Bakri responded that he had "seen hundreds of films that deny and ignore what happened to Palestinians, yet never complained or tried to ban any film."

The main line of defense for Bakri and his film is that, as the Supreme Court found, choosing not to show 'both sides' of a story is not grounds for censorship. Bakri is being represented by attorney Avigdor Feldman, who told Haaretz, "Bakri doesn't say anything in this film. The people who talk are those he filmed. So the residents of the refugee camp say things which sometimes are true and sometimes not. It's a movie. It reflects the subjective understanding of the speakers. Sometimes they say things that are harsher [than they actually were] because that is how he experienced it."

The Mohammad Bakri Defense Committee adds: "For his artistic integrity and his focus on the experiences and narratives of his fellow Palestinians, Mohammad Bakri faces the potential of financial ruin in the face of spurious legal charges and dubious claims of defamation." A major component of the argument for the defense in the most recent allegations is that none of the plaintiffs, Ofer Ben-Natan, Doron Keidar, Nir Oshri, Adam Arbiv and Yonatan Van-Kaspel, are mentioned by name or shown in the film.

=== Second defamation lawsuit and ban ===
In November 2016, Israeli army reserve officer Nissim Magnagi sued Bakri for defamation over the film in the Lod District Court. While the previous defamation suit had been dismissed on account of the plaintiffs not being specifically identified in the film, Magnagi was found to have had a legal basis for a defamation suit as he had appeared in the film. In January 2021, the court accepted Magnagi's defamation claim and restored the ban on the film. Bakri was ordered to pay NIS 175,000 in compensation to Magnagi as well as NIS 50,000 in legal expenses.

== Awards and nominations ==
Jenin, Jenin was awarded Best Film at the 2002 Carthage International Film Festival in Tunis, and the 2003 International Prize for Mediterranean Documentary Filmmaking & Reporting.
