= Quza =

Village in the Nablus Governorate, Palestine

- Municipality type D (Village council)

Arabic transcription(s)
  - Arabic: قوزة
- Location of Quza within the West Bank Location of Jalud within Palestine
- Coordinates: 32°8′17″N 35°15′20″E
- Palestine grid: 174/171
- State: Palestine
- Governorate: Nablus

Government
  - Type: Village council
- Name meaning: "The word in Arabic means a vegetable like the egg-plant"

Quza (Arabic: قوزة; also transliterated Qūza) is a Palestinian village in the Nablus Governorate of the West Bank, near the town of Huwwara. It is situated 11 kms south of Nablus City.

== History ==
The Samaritan chronicle, the Tolidah, identifies Quza with Qiryat Siqta. It relates that one of the sons of Samaritan notable Muwannis b. Radap b. Rabīʿ settled there, planted vineyards and olive trees, and named a local stream Naḥal Maḥzūqa after his son. Samaritan tradition, identifying the place of the Binding of Isaac with Mount Gerizim towering over Quza, associated the village with the place where Abraham instructed his servants to “stay here with the donkey” while he and Isaac continued toward the site of the sacrifice, as recounted in Genesis 22:5.

Ceramics from the late Byzantine era have been found here.

=== Ottoman period ===
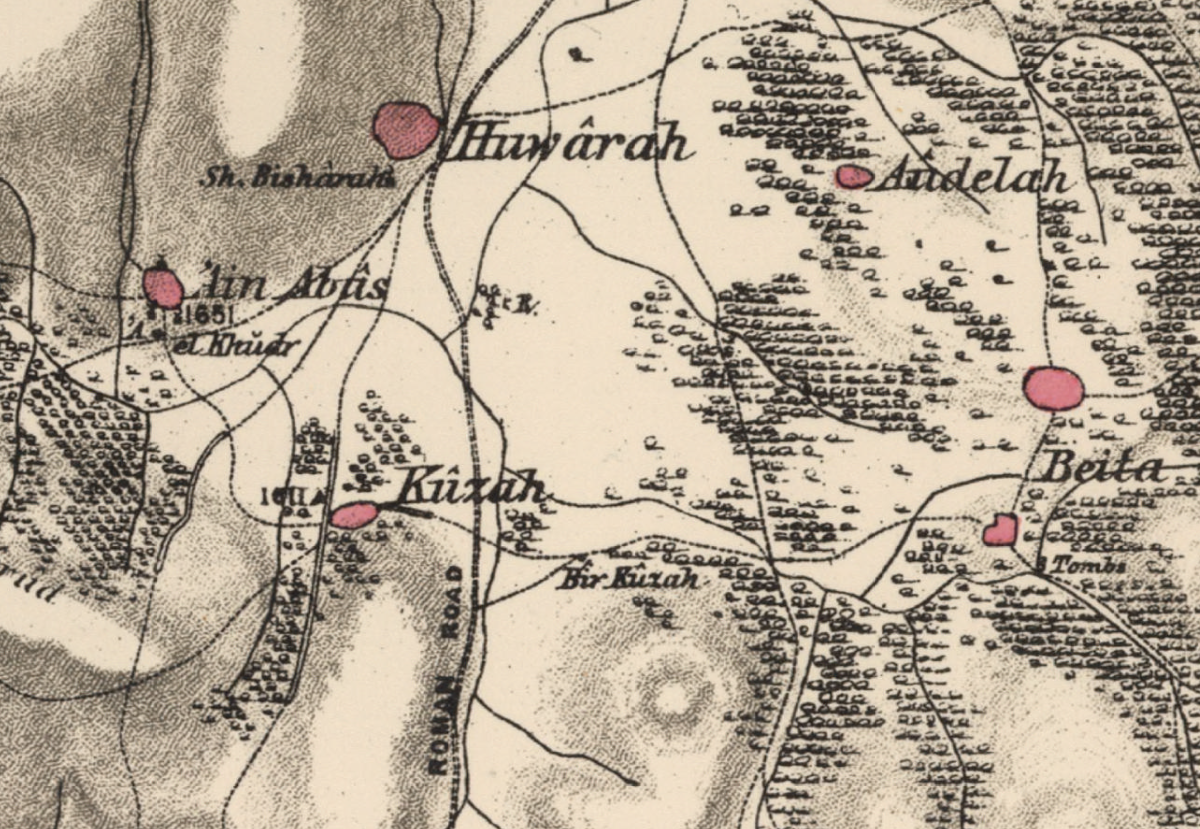

Incorporated into the Ottoman Empire in 1517 with the rest of Palestine, in 1596 the village appeared in Ottoman tax registers as being in the nahiya of Jabal Qubal, part of Nablus Sanjak. It had a population of 15 households and 2 bachelors, all Muslim. They paid a fixed tax-rate of 33.3% on agricultural products, including wheat (1775 a.), barley (250 a.), summer crops (1000 a.), and olive trees (200 a.); a total of 3,225 akçe.

In 1853, Quza was engaged in a battle with the neighboring villages of Huwwara and Beita which left 12 men and 5 women dead.

In 1882, the PEF's Survey of Western Palestine described Kûzah as "a small village at the foot of the hills in an open valley", supplied by a well to the east. It identified the Samaritan name as Kirjath Tzekathah and tentatively associated it with the Chusi mentioned in the Book of Judith.

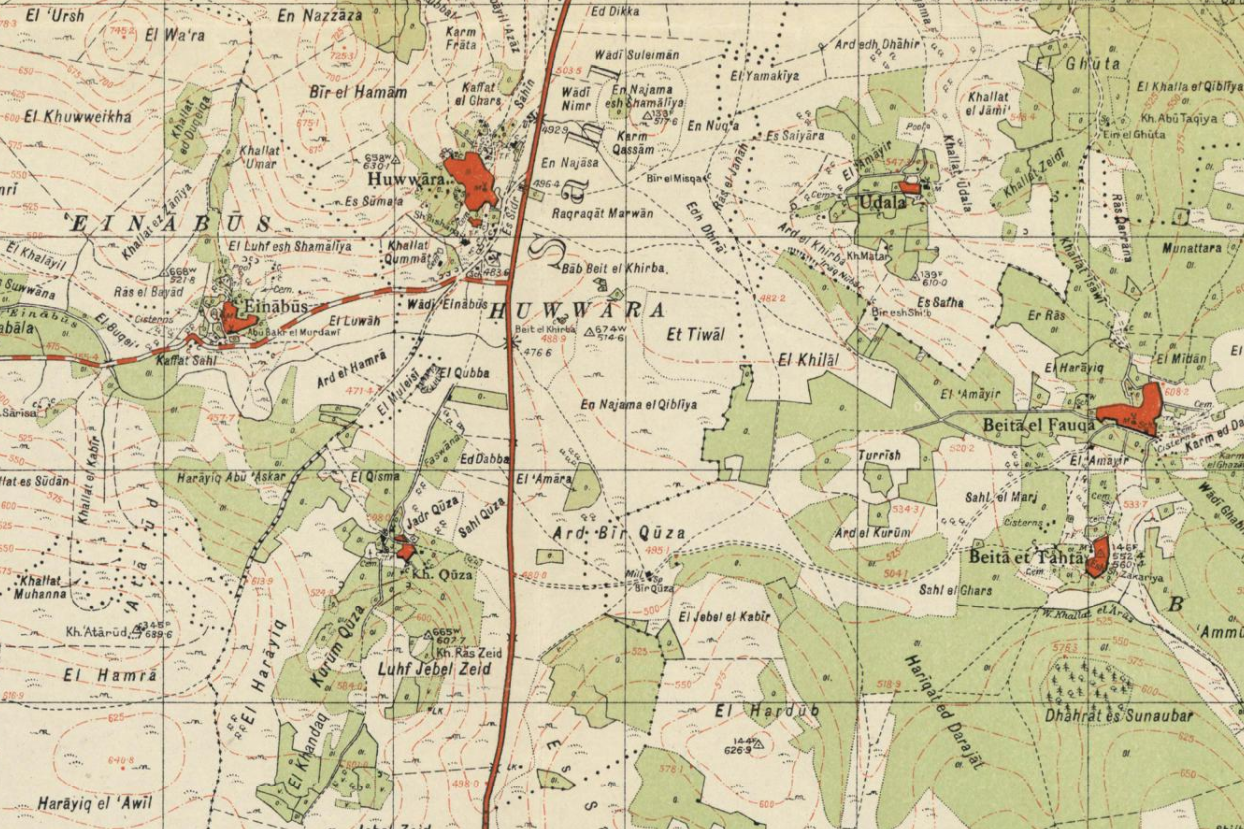

=== Jordanian period ===
In the wake of the 1948 Arab–Israeli War, and after the 1949 Armistice Agreements, Quza came under Jordanian rule. The Jordanian census of 1961 found 148 inhabitants here.

=== Post 1967 ===
Since the 1967 Six-Day War, Quza has been under Israeli occupation.

The village water source, Bir Quza, is located east of the village in the valley, and is shared with the town of Beita. On May 28, 2026, Israeli settlers from a newly established illegal outpost attacked the Bir Quza neighbourhood, smashing Palestinian vehicles.

On June 17, 2026, Israeli settlers again raided the Bir Quza neighborhood, damaging cars and breaking windows. Anonymous Palestinian sources reported that Israeli forces later attacked the area, injuring 4 Palestinians.

== Bibliography ==
- Avneri, Arieh L. (1984). The Claim of Dispossession: Jewish Land-settlement and the Arabs, 1878-1948. Transaction Publishers. ISBN 0-87855-964-7. Archived from the original on 2023-01-19.
- Conder, C.R. (1876). "Samaritan Topography". Quarterly Statement - Palestine Exploration Fund. 8: 182-197. (Conder, 1876, p. 196)
- Conder, C.R.; Kitchener, H.H. (1882). The Survey of Western Palestine: Memoirs of the Topography, Orography, Hydrography, and Archaeology. Vol. 2. London: Committee of the Palestine Exploration Fund.
- Dauphin, C. (1998). La Palestine byzantine, Peuplement et Populations. BAR International Series 726 (in French). Vol. III : Catalogue. Oxford: Archeopress. ISBN 0860549054. Archived from the original on 2023-03-09.
- Finn, J. (1878). E.A. Finn (ed.). Stirring Times: Or Records from Jerusalem Consular Chronicles of 1853 to 1856. Vol. 1. London.
- Government of Jordan, Department of Statistics (1964). First Census of Population and Housing. Volume I: Final Tables; General Characteristics of the Population (PDF). Archived from the original (PDF) on 2015-04-03.
- Hütteroth, W.-D.; Abdulfattah, K. (1977). Historical Geography of Palestine, Transjordan and Southern Syria in the Late 16th Century. Erlanger Geographische Arbeiten, Sonderband 5. Erlangen, Germany: Vorstand der Fränkischen Geographischen Gesellschaft. ISBN 3-920405-41-2.
- Palmer, E.H. (1881). The Survey of Western Palestine: Arabic and English Name Lists Collected During the Survey by Lieutenants Conder and Kitchener, R. E. Transliterated and Explained by E.H. Palmer. Committee of the Palestine Exploration Fund.
