= Huwara =

Huwara Howwarah
- Municipality type C

Arabic transcription(s)
  - Arabic: حُوّارة
  - Latin: Howwarah (official); Huwara (unofficial); Ḥuwwārah (technical)
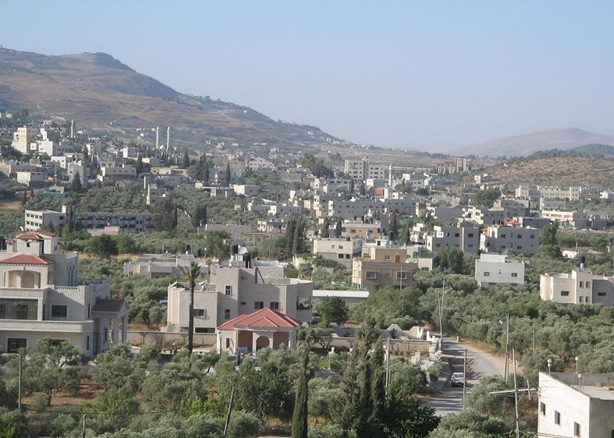
- Huwara

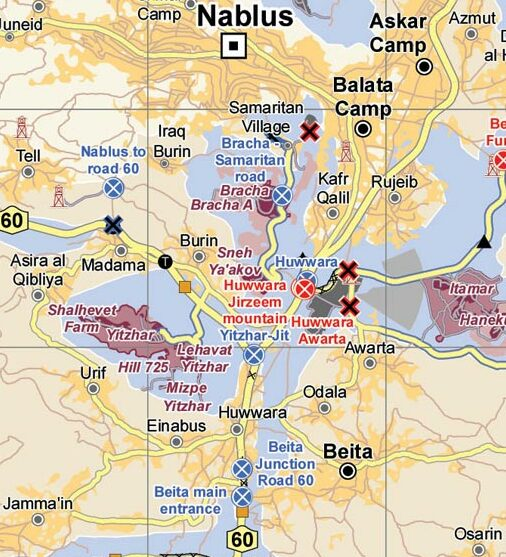

- Location of Huwara within Palestine
- Coordinates: 32°09′09″N 35°15′24″E
- Palestine grid: 174/173
- State: State of Palestine
- Governorate: Nablus

Government
  - Type: Municipality

Area
  - Total: 7,982 dunams (7.982 km^{2}; 3.082 sq mi)

Population (2017)
  - Total: 6,659
  - Density: 834.3/km^{2} (2,161/sq mi)
- Name meaning: "White marl"

Huwara or Howwarah (Arabic: حُوّارة, romanized: Ḥuwwārah, pronounced [ħʊwˈwaːra]) is a Palestinian town located in the Nablus Governorate of the State of Palestine. Located in the northern Israeli-occupied West Bank, Huwara is on the main road connecting Nablus southwards to Ramallah and Jerusalem, approximately 4 miles (6 km) from Jacob's Well. According to the Palestinian Central Bureau of Statistics, the town had a population of 6,659 in 2017.

Huwara is a flashpoint town in the Israeli-Palestinian conflict. Huwara is on the main road to nearby Israeli settlements, leading to frequent clashes between Israeli soldiers and settlers and local Palestinians. Most notably, two Israeli civilian-settlers passing the town were shot by a Palestinian gunman in a shooting attack. In response to the shooting attack, the town was rampaged by hundreds of Israeli settlers, who torched Palestinian businesses and houses, leaving one dead and one hundred Palestinians injured.

Israel constructed a bypass road around Huwara to avoid having the Israeli settlers pass through the Palestinian town.

== Location ==
Huwara is located 7.28 kilometers (4.52 mi) south of Nablus. It is bordered by Awarta, Odala and Beita to the east, Za'tara and Yasuf to the south, Jamma'in and Einabus to the west, and Asira al-Qibliya and Burin to the north. Highway 60 passes through the town. Other nearby highways include Highway 5, Highway 55, and Highway 57.

== History ==
=== Antiquity ===
Huwara is an ancient site, and cisterns and rock-cut tombs have been found, together with remains of columns. It has been suggested that Huwara should be identified with Horon, hometown of Sanballat the Horonite.

Huwara is identified with the Samaritan village of Hivria (Hebrew: חוריא).

=== Crusader period ===
Diya al-Din (1173−1245) noted that in the 12th and 13th centuries Huwara was inhabited by Muslims. Finkelstein did not find any potsherds predating the Ottoman era.

=== Ottoman period (1516–1917) ===
The village was incorporated into the Ottoman Empire in 1517 with all of Palestine, and in 1596 it appeared in the tax registers as being in the Nahiya of Jabal Qubal, part of Nablus Sanjak. It had a population of 87 households, all Muslim. The villagers paid a fixed tax rate of 33.3% on various products, such as wheat, barley, summer crops, olives, goats and/or beehives, and a press for olives or grapes, in addition to "occasional revenues"; a total of 14,000 akçe.

In 1838, Robinson described Huwara as a "large and old village". It was also noted as a Muslim village, in Jurat Merda, south of Nablus.

In the 1850s the Ottoman rulers withdrew their soldiers from the district (to be used in the Crimean War), and hence open hostility could ensue between different Palestinian factions. In 1853, Huwara was engaged in a battle with the neighboring villages of Quza and Beita which left 12 men and 5 women dead.

Victor Guérin visited the village in 1870. He found the village, (which he called Haouarah), to have about 800 inhabitants, and that it was divided into two districts, each administered by a sheikh. A oualy was dedicated to Abou en-Nebyh Sahin.

In 1882, the PEF's Survey of Western Palestine described Huwarah as a village "of stone and mud at the foot of Gerizim, just over the main road. It has an appearance of antiquity, and covers a considerable extent of ground".

=== British Mandate period ===
In the 1922 census of Palestine conducted by the British Mandate authorities, Huwara had a population of 921, all Muslims, increasing slightly in the 1931 census, where Huwara (together with the smaller location Bir Quza) had 240 occupied houses and a population of 955, still all Muslims.

In the 1945 statistics Huwwara had a population of 1,300, all Muslims, with 7,982 dunams of land, according to an official land and population survey. Of this, 607 dunams were plantations and irrigable land, 4,858 used for cereals, while 129 dunams were built-up (urban) land.

The first elementary school was established in 1947. Huwara Elementary as well as secondary schools serves infants from neighboring villages up to the present time.

=== Jordanian period ===
In the wake of the 1948 Arab–Israeli War, and after the 1949 Armistice Agreements, Huwara came under Jordanian rule. The first elementary school was converted into secondary school in 1962. The first female elementary school was established in 1957.

The Jordanian census of 1961 found 1,966 inhabitants.

=== Post-1967–2022 ===
Since the 1967 Six-Day War, Huwara has been under Israeli occupation.

After the 1995 accords, 38% of Huwwara land was classified as Area B, the remaining 62% as Area C.

According to Applied Research Institute–Jerusalem, Israel has confiscated 282 dunams of Huwwara land for the Israeli settlement of Yitzhar.

During the Second Intifada, in October 2000, the Huwara Checkpoint was established north of Huwara, as one of the Israeli checkpoints around Nablus controlling traffic between this city and Ramallah.

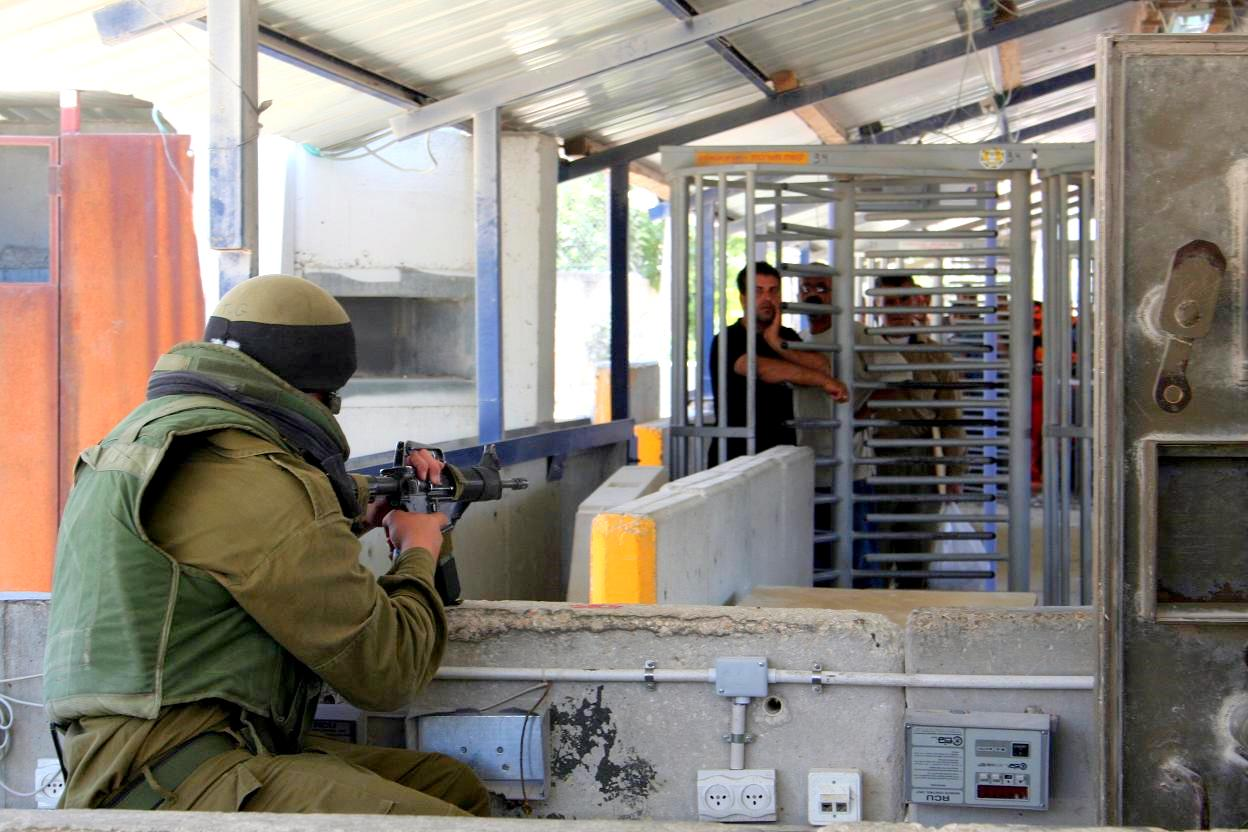
Israeli soldier faces Palestinians waiting at the Huwara checkpoint, at the entrance to Nablus, 12 June 2006.

Huwara has been the target of price tag attacks, random acts of violence by Jewish Israeli settlers. According to the International Middle East Media Center (IMEMC), in April 2010 settlers torched three Palestinian vehicles in Huwara, while on 27 February 2011, in a price-tag attack against the evacuation of Havat Gilad, settlers threw molotov cocktails at a house in the village. In March 2012 a Star of David was sprayed on a village mosque. In March 2013, hours after the Tapuah Junction stabbing, Jewish settlers descended on Huwara in another price-tag attack. They attacked a bus carrying Palestinian schoolgirls with stones, shattering a wind-shield and wounding the driver.

In October 2014, during the olive harvest season, a fire razed to the ground huge swathes of Palestinian-owned agricultural land between the village of Huwara, near Nablus and the Yitzhar settlement in the West Bank, destroying over a hundred olive trees. Although the cause of the fire has been contested, the mayor of Huwara claimed masked men from nearby Yitzhar and surrounding settlements set the fire by pouring incendiary fluids on the trees and that the Israel Defense Forces prevented Palestinian citizens from reaching the lands in order to extinguish the fire. Later on, the Israeli forces allowed the civil defence from the adjacent Palestinian village of Burin to extinguish the fire, but only after it had expanded to an even larger area . The burning and damaging of olive trees is an ongoing-concern of the United Nations, a pattern the New York Times call "price tag" attacks. The United Nations has reported that by 2013 "...Israeli settlers damaged or destroyed nearly 11,000 olive trees owned by the Palestinians in the occupied West Bank."

The Huwara Checkpoint was dismantled in 2011 in order to ease traffic between Nablus and Ramallah.

Its location on the main road, used by both Israelis from four Israeli settlements in the Nablus area and Palestinians from the Nablus area, is a controlling factor of the life in Huwara. The town has many businesses located on the road, which is controlled by the Israeli army to ensure free passage to Jews and Arabs.

=== 2023–present ===
On 26 February 2023, a Palestinian gunman shot and killed two Israeli settlers aged 19 and 20 as they drove through Huwara. The shooting was condemned by Israel but praised by Palestinian militant groups. Those militant groups said the shooting attack was a response to an Israeli army incursion into Nablus that killed eleven Palestinians several days earlier.

Soon after, Huwara was attacked by hundreds of Israeli settlers who torched 30 homes and cars (some sources say "200 buildings" across "four Palestinian villages"), and killed one Palestinian, in what international media sources characterized as an "unprecedented settler rampage".

Witnesses and video evidence indicated that Israeli soldiers watched, but did not act to halt the violence. The Israeli army was criticized for not intervening, despite expecting the violence. But Israel's West Bank commander, Maj. Gen. Yehuda Fuchs, said the army was unprepared for the severity of the Huwara attack, calling it "a pogrom done by outlaws"—a term historically applied to mob attacks against eastern European Jews in the 1800s and early 1900s. The rampage was condemned by both Israeli and Palestinian politicians.

Following the attack, Israel's new far-right Finance Minister, Bezalel Smotrich—now with new authority over the West Bank—stated "I think the village of Huwara needs to be wiped out. I think the State of Israel should do it." The remark triggered international condemnation from the U.N. Secretary General, the United States State Department (which called for Israeli Prime Minister Benjamin Netanyahu to renounce it), Jordan, the United Arab Emirates and others. The remark came before a scheduled major fund-raising visit by Smotrich to the United States, and multiple Jewish rights organizations called for the State Department to deny him entry. In response to both external and internal criticism, Smotrich qualified his statement. He said he didn’t support completely wiping out Huwara, but rather called on Israel to wipe out militants and their supporters from Huwara in order to restore security in the region.

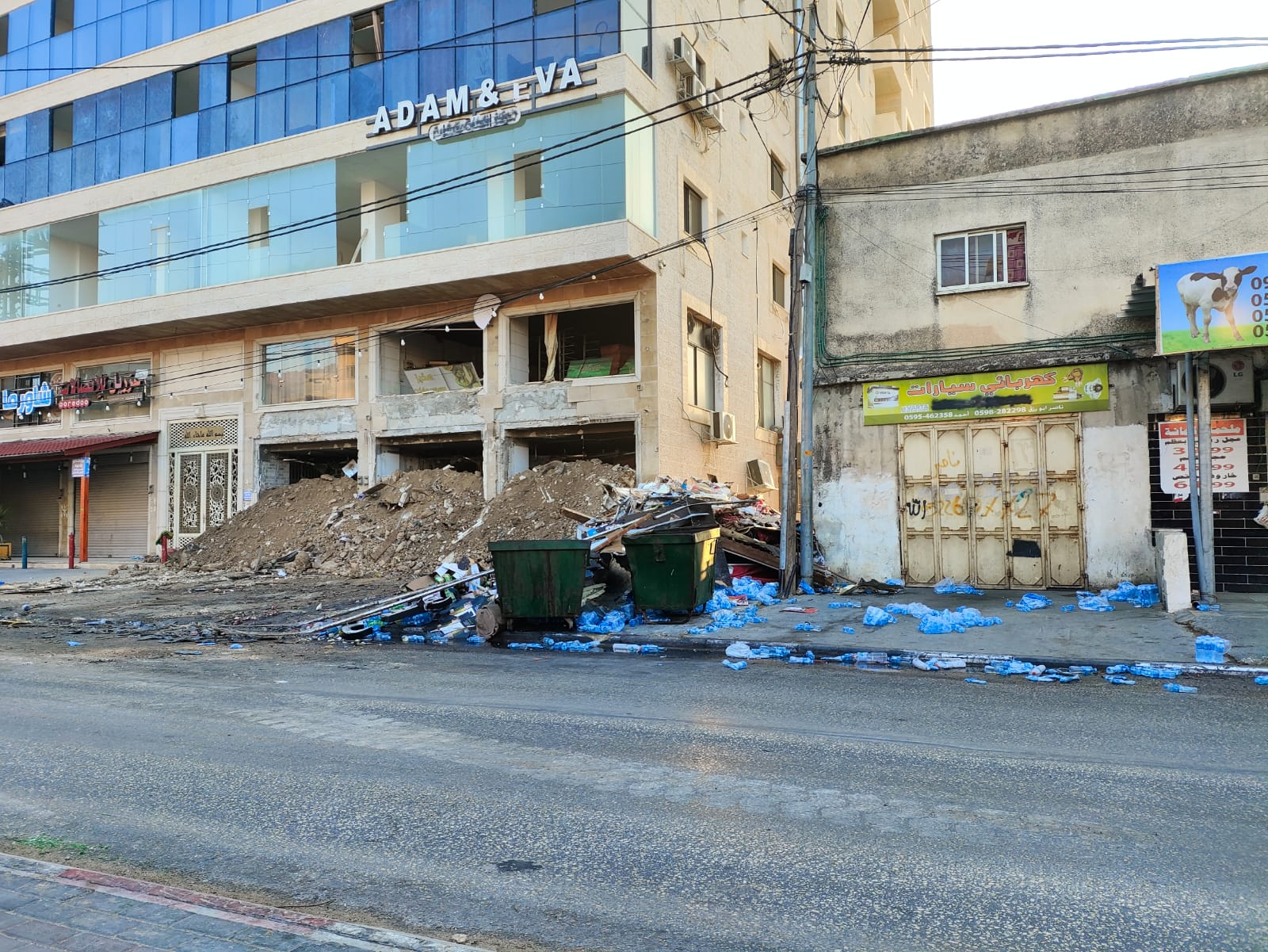
Ruins of 'Pizza Eiffel' in Hawara following its demolition by the IDF in response to an advertisement involving an Israeli citizen kidnapped by Hamas.

In October 2023, after the October 7 attacks and taking of hostages, a pizzeria in Huwara posted an advertisement seemingly mocking an elderly hostage. In response, the IDF proceeded to demolish the pizzeria.

== Demography ==
=== Diaspora ===
Huwara has a considerable diaspora. Inhabitants of Sufir, Beitunia, Mukhmas, and others can trace their lineage back to this village.

== Bibliography ==
- Avneri, Arieh L. (1984). The Claim of Dispossession: Jewish Land-settlement and the Arabs, 1878-1948. Transaction Publishers. ISBN 0-87855-964-7. Archived from the original on 19 January 2023.
- Barron, J.B., ed. (1923). Palestine: Report and General Abstracts of the Census of 1922. Government of Palestine.
- Conder, C.R.; Kitchener, H.H. (1882). The Survey of Western Palestine: Memoirs of the Topography, Orography, Hydrography, and Archaeology. Vol. 2. London: Committee of the Palestine Exploration Fund.
- Dauphin, C. (1998). La Palestine byzantine, Peuplement et Populations. BAR International Series 726 (in French). Vol. III : Catalogue. Oxford: Archeopress. ISBN 0860549054. Archived from the original on 9 March 2023.
- Ellenblum, R. (2003). Frankish Rural Settlement in the Latin Kingdom of Jerusalem. Cambridge University Press. ISBN 9780521521871. Archived from the original on 9 March 2023.
- Finkelstein, I.; Lederman, Zvi, eds. (1997). Highlands of many cultures. Tel Aviv: Institute of Archaeology of Tel Aviv University Publications Section. ISBN 965-440-007-3.
- Finn, J. (1878). E.A. Finn (ed.). Stirring Times: Or Records from Jerusalem Consular Chronicles of 1853 to 1856. Vol. 1. London.
- Government of Jordan, Department of Statistics (1964). First Census of Population and Housing. Volume I: Final Tables; General Characteristics of the Population (PDF). Archived from the original (PDF) on 3 April 2015.
- Government of Palestine, Department of Statistics (1945). Village Statistics, April, 1945. Archived from the original on 2 April 2019.
- Guérin, V. (1874). Description Géographique Historique et Archéologique de la Palestine (in French). Vol. 2: Samarie, pt. 1. Paris: L'Imprimerie Nationale.
- Hadawi, S. (1970). Village Statistics of 1945: A Classification of Land and Area ownership in Palestine. Palestine Liberation Organization Research Center. Archived from the original on 8 December 2018.
- Hütteroth, W.-D.; Abdulfattah, K. (1977). Historical Geography of Palestine, Transjordan and Southern Syria in the Late 16th Century. Erlanger Geographische Arbeiten, Sonderband 5. Erlangen, Germany: Vorstand der Fränkischen Geographischen Gesellschaft. ISBN 3-920405-41-2. Archived from the original on 17 January 2023.
- Mills, E., ed. (1932). Census of Palestine 1931. Population of Villages, Towns and Administrative Areas. Jerusalem: Government of Palestine.
- Palmer, E.H. (1881). The Survey of Western Palestine: Arabic and English Name Lists Collected During the Survey by Lieutenants Conder and Kitchener, R. E. Transliterated and Explained by E.H. Palmer. Committee of the Palestine Exploration Fund.
- Robinson, E.; Smith, E. (1841). Biblical Researches in Palestine, Mount Sinai and Arabia Petraea: A Journal of Travels in the year 1838. Vol. 3. Boston: Crocker & Brewster.
- Rix, Herbert (1907). Tent and Testament: A Camping Tour in Palestine. New York, London: Scribner. pp. 25.
- Saulcy, L.F. de (1854). Narrative of a journey round the Dead Sea, and in the Bible lands, in 1850 and 1851. Vol. 1, new edition. London: R. Bentley. (Saulcy, 1854, vol 1, p. 102)
- Schölch, A. (1993). Palestine in Transformation, 1856-1882: Studies in Social, Economic, and Political Development (PDF). Institute for Palestine Studies. ISBN 0-88728-234-2.
