= Lawfare Project =

American think tank and litigation fund

The Lawfare Project
- Formation: 2010; 16 years ago
- Founder: Brooke Goldstein
- Type: 501(c)(3) organization
- Tax ID no.: 27-2402908
- Headquarters: New York, New York, United States
- Executive Director: Brooke Goldstein
- Website: thelawfareproject.org

The Lawfare Project is an American nonprofit organization founded by attorney Brooke Goldstein in 2010. The Lawfare Project describes itself as "a U.S.-based think tank and litigation fund that fights anti-Semitic and anti-Israeli discrimination around the world."

== Overview ==
The Lawfare Project has said that the International Criminal Court has attacked Western democracies by making allegations of human rights abuses that undermine public confidence in government.

According to law professor Orde Kittrie, the Lawfare Project has developed innovative legal arguments demonstrating the inconsistency of New York state laws with boycotts of Israel.

== Lawsuits ==
The Lawfare Project has had a longstanding legal battle against Kuwait Airways for its refusal to fly Israeli passengers. The organization represented "an Israeli traveller who booked a ticket with Kuwait Airways to fly from Frankfurt to Bangkok, only to be refused at the last minute when it emerged that he was an Israeli citizen."

Through January 2018, the Lawfare Project's Spanish attorney, Ignacio Wenley Palacios, had secured 46 writs of injunction and court decisions against the Boycotts of Israel in Spain. A court issued an interim injunction against the city council of Castrillón for its boycott of Israeli products and a court in Barcelona annulled a boycott passed by the city council of El Prat de Llobregat. According to Palacios, the Lawfare Project had succeeded in establishing a legal doctrine that "boycotts of Israel infringe on human rights, violate free speech and are tantamount to discrimination on account of national origin and personal opinions."

In June 2017, the Lawfare Project and the law firm Winston & Strawn filed a lawsuit against San Francisco State University (SFSU) on behalf of a group of SFSU students and members of the local Jewish community, alleging that the public school had fostered a climate of antisemitism "marked by violent threats to the safety of Jewish students on campus." The suit alleged "that the school has violated the plaintiffs' constitutional rights to free speech and equal protection, as well as a provision of the Civil Rights Act." In addition to the federal lawsuit, the Lawfare Project and Winston & Strawn filed a second lawsuit in February 2018 against SFSU in the Superior Court of California for the County of San Francisco. California Superior Court Judge Richard Ulmer Jr. scheduled the trial to take place on March 4, 2019.

In November 2017, the Lawfare Project supported a lawsuit by the Belgian Federation of Jewish Organizations (CCOJB) against a ban on shechita, the Jewish ritual religious slaughter of animals, in Wallonia, Belgium. In January 2018, the Lawfare Project supported a second lawsuit by CCOJB for restrictions on shechita in Flanders.

As of 2018, the Lawfare Project was preparing a lawsuit against the Irish Occupied Territories Bill, which, if enacted, would prohibit trade with territories considered illegally occupied under international law, including but not limited to Israeli-occupied territories. The Lawfare Project described the bill as a "highly aggressive anti-Israel boycott policy within a national government that targets individuals not based on their conduct, but on their national origin and place of residence" and argued that it violates European Union trade regulations.
