= Huwara checkpoint =

Israeli checkpoint in the city of Nablus

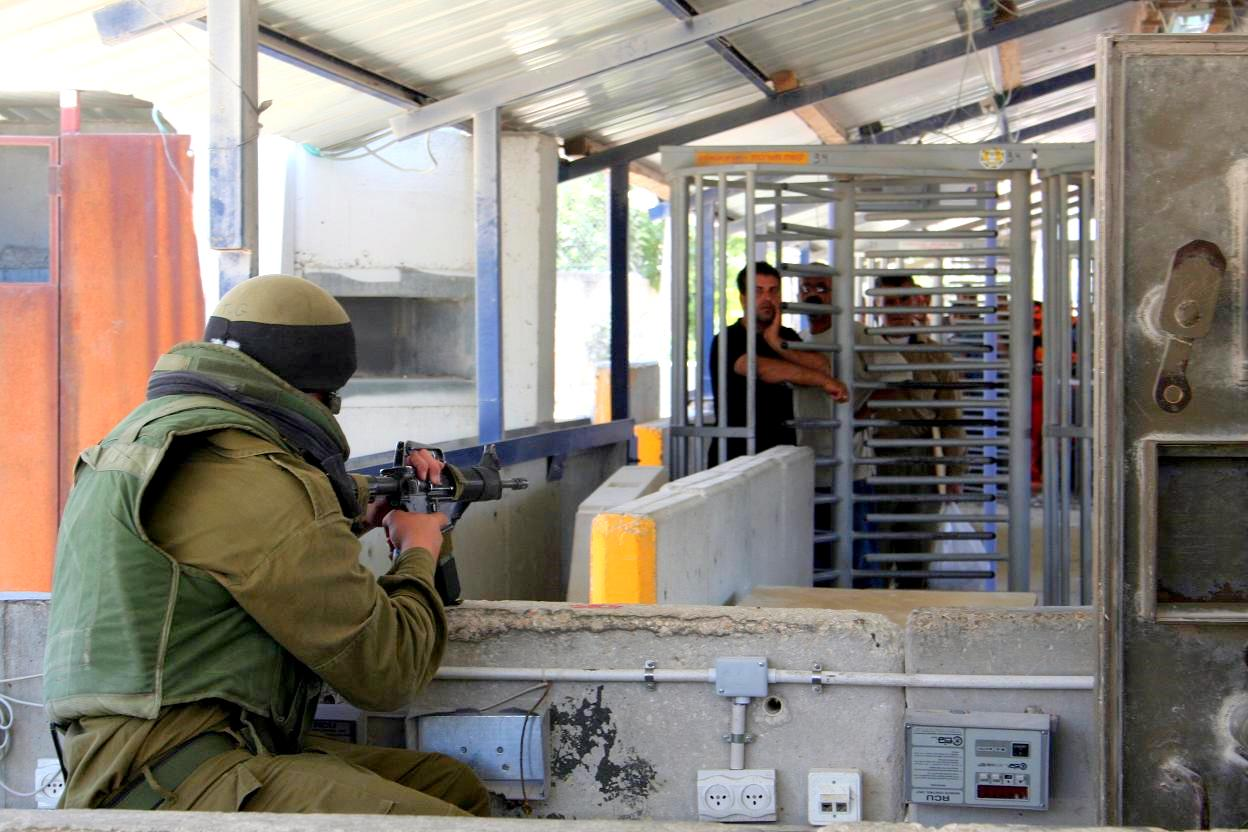
- Israeli soldier and Palestinians at the checkpoint in 2006

Location
- Location: West Bank
- Coordinates: 32°10′40″N 35°16′23″E

Details
- Opened: 2002; 24 years ago
- Operated by: Israel Defence Forces

The Huwara checkpoint (Hebrew: מחסום חווארה; Arabic: حاجز حوارة) is a checkpoint operated by the Israel Defense Forces (IDF) at one of the four main exits of Nablus. Situated to the south of the city, it was named after the nearby town of Huwara. It was established in October 2000, during the Second Intifada, and was a major checkpoint until the October 7 attacks in 2023, after which it was closed to all Palestinians.

== History ==
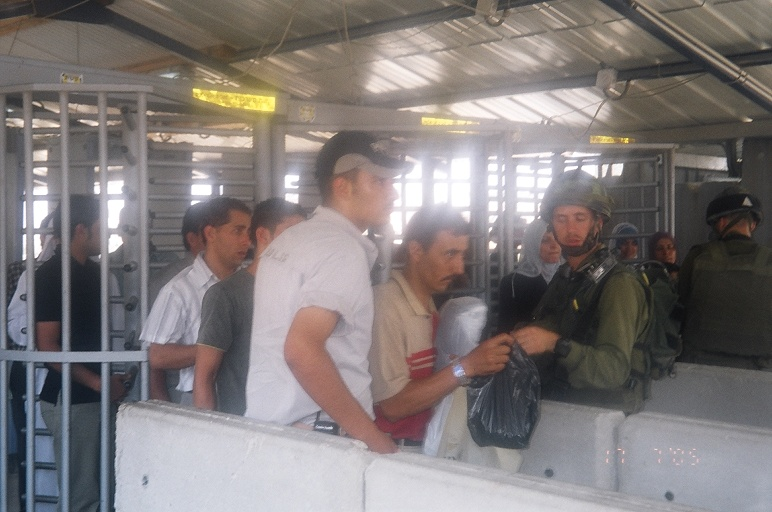
Palestinians and an Israeli soldier at the Huwara checkpoint, 2005

In 2002, the checkpoint was open from morning to evening. Later, it remained open for 24 hours every day. All vehicles were required to have special permits and be searched. By 2004, there were reports of long lines and overcrowding, and the checkpoint was said to be "one of the busiest in the West Bank."

In February 2007, Palestinian artist Khaled Jarrar held a photo exhibition at Hawara and several other checkpoints, showing photos of Palestinian life and experiences at the checkpoints. According to the International Solidarity Movement, the "photos were hung on the chain-link fence pedestrians have to pass as they enter Nablus."

In 2008, renovations were carried out to ease the overcrowding. Conditions at Hawara were relaxed in July 2009. The checkpoint was opened to allow pedestrians to cross freely without being searched. Palestinian vehicles have sometimes faced random inspections. In 2011, Israeli newspapers reported that the checkpoint would be removed, but according to the Palestinian human rights organization Al-Haq, the checkpoint was still in use in 2014.

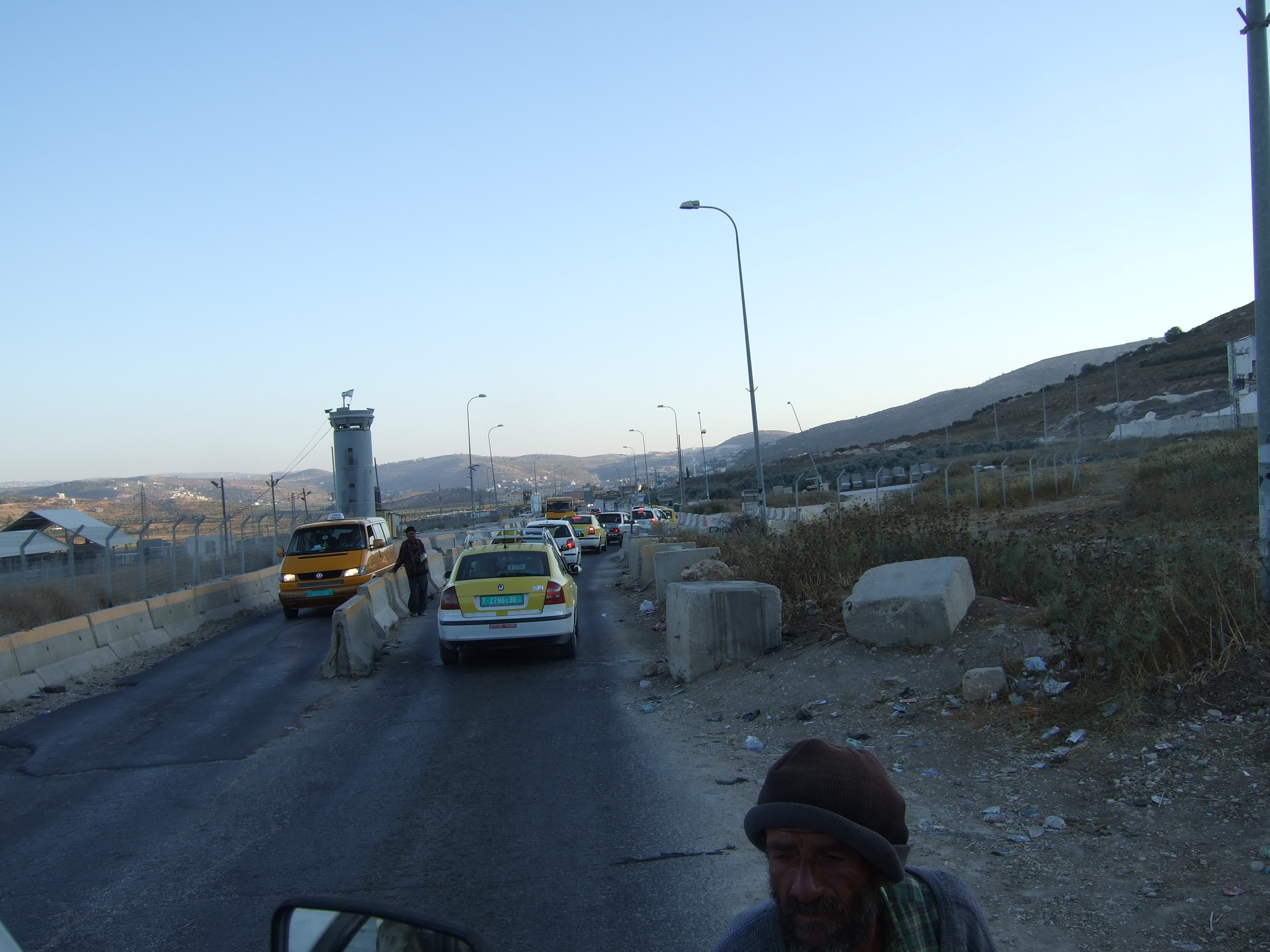
Cars in line to pass through the checkpoint leaving Nablus, 2009

Machsom Watch reported that after the February 2023 Huwara rampage, the IDF increased armed presence at all checkpoints and added a layer of gates to the Huwara checkpoint. They also paved a new bypass road reaching from Tapuach Junction to the Awarta checkpoint, intended for Israeli settlers wanting to avoid the Huwara checkpoint. On 18 September 2023, Middle East Monitor reported that security measures at all checkpoints were tightened, and the Huwara checkpoint was among the checkpoints that were closed to residents.

Huwara checkpoint has been closed to Palestinians after the attacks on 7 October 2023. As of July 2025, it has been blocked by the West Bank barrier. In order to enter Nablus, northbound travelers entering from Road 60 must travel north along the Huwara bypass and enter through the Awarta checkpoint.

== Reception ==
Throughout the 2000s, accounts of the checkpoint described issues for travelers moving through the checkpoint, and for the soldiers manning the checkpoint. Travelers reported long wait times, property damage, harassment, humiliation, delay or denial of access to medical services, mistreatment of women, and violence from the soldiers, including beatings and shootings.

The soldiers working at Huwara checkpoint reported untenable working conditions. The checkpoint came under international scrutiny in 2004, when an IDF soldier was convicted in Israeli military court for "numerous instances of violent behavior toward Palestinians crossing at the checkpoint". Soldiers stationed there said that the issues are systemic, not necessarily personal to any individual soldier, and that working conditions are a driving cause of violence and mistreatment of travelers. In 2004, one soldier stationed there said, "Most soldiers prefer to be under fire than at those roadblocks." Another said, "Everyone, no matter how moral, if he feels a commitment to the mission, will or could fall into violence. We're all told we shouldn't behave badly to civilians -- never hit them, never yell. But after eight hours in the sun, you're not so strong." According to a third soldier, "Every day, the regulations were different. [...] One day, you can let everyone pass; on another, no one is able to come in. It's very difficult to explain. They don't care if someone in Nablus wants to explode himself in Israel. They just want to live their life. Regardless of how strong you are, dealing with these problems is too much." One soldier said that the IDF did not teach very much Arabic to the soldiers deployed to the checkpoint; most soldiers did not speak Arabic and many travelers passing through Huwara did not speak Hebrew, so there was often a language barrier that exacerbated tensions at the checkpoint.

One foreign national traveling with Médecins du Monde said in 2005 that an IDF Captain and spokesperson told her that "[t]he Qalandiya and Huwara checkpoints are the worst ones. Go to any other one, and they run smoothly.” She also said, "As we passed through the Huwara checkpoint [...] the atmosphere changed; the tension was palpable."

In 2007, Mohammed Dweikat of the Palestinian Body for Peace, Dialogue and Equality (HASM) commented on Khaled Jarrar's photo exhibition, which depicted Palestinian experiences at various checkpoints, including Hawara checkpoint. Dweikat said, "We are doing this as Nablus is the most imprisoned city in the West Bank. Since 2002 it has only been possible to enter through six checkpoints on foot. It is even more difficult to exit. Men between [the ages of] 16 and 45 (it varies from day to day) can only exit their city with a special permit that can be obtained only outside Nablus. Almost nightly its citizens are the victims of violent military raids and their lives have not been peaceful, or normal for years."

Over the years, humanitarian groups like Machsom Watch, B'Tselem, and the International Solidarity Movement have made efforts to improve conditions for Palestinians at the checkpoint. Some organizations are watchdogs, some share testimonies from people who experience mistreatment at the checkpoint, and some play more active roles by negotiating or coordinating with the IDF.

== Incidents ==
=== 2002 ===
A Palestinian woman named Maysoon al-Hayek (Note: Sometimes referred to as "Maysoun Saleh Nayef Hayek") said that on 25 February 2002, she went into labour, so she, her husband, and her father-in-law began to drive from their home in Zeita-Jamma'in to the Rafidia Hospital in Nablus. At Huwara checkpoint, the soldiers took about an hour to search the car thoroughly, then told the group they were not allowed to pass through the checkpoint. Then the group informed the soldiers that al-Hayek needed to go to the hospital because she was in labour and in severe pain, and then al-Hayek complied when the soldiers requested to see her belly as proof. They were then allowed through the checkpoint, but about 600 meters away from the checkpoint Israeli soldiers began shooting at the car from the front. The attack lasted for almost five minutes; the soldiers killed al-Hayek's husband, and injured both al-Hayek and her father-in law. The soldiers stopped firing, then came to the car and pulled al-Hayek out of it. The soldiers then made her undress completely, one or two garments at a time, which they said was required to determine how pregnant she was; recalling this, al-Hayek referred to it as "humiliation", saying that she "was ready to go as far as that in order to get to the hospital before it was late." After she was completely naked, the soldiers put her onto a stretcher and gave her intravenous glucose. They called separate ambulances for al-Hayek and her father-in-law, who were both left naked on stretchers for about 30 minutes as they were transported back to the checkpoint to wait for the ambulance. Eventually, after al-Hayek shouted at them, the soldiers gave her back the robe she had been wearing, so that she would not be cold. Ultimately, al-Hayek gave birth on the hospital elevator. Once she began to recover, al-Hayek filed a complaint against the IDF. Humanitarian groups have pointed to al-Hayek's story to show that Israeli soldiers at checkpoints sometimes cause undue harm to women. For example, Amnesty International said that "the practice by Israeli soldiers of delaying or denying passage to women in labour at checkpoints, effectively denying them medical treatment when it is clearly necessary and urgent, constitutes cruel, inhuman and degrading treatment."

=== 2003–2005 ===
In April 2003, a group of Palestinians reported that IDF soldiers had written numbers in ink on the Palestinians' hands while they were waiting in line at Huwara checkpoint. The military confirmed the event and said that a single soldier had done this on his own, without directions from superiors, and that he would be facing a disciplinary hearing. However, the IDF continued the practice of writing tracking numbers on the bodies of Palestinians in other contexts, and this drew criticism–especially from Holocaust survivors, who compared the practice to the Nazis' practice of tattooing tracking numbers on concentration camp detainees, many of whom were Jewish.

On 24 March 2004, a 16-year-old Palestinian boy known as Hussam Abdo tried to pass through the checkpoint while having an explosive belt strapped to his body for an attempted suicide attack. However, he failed to do so and subsequently surrendered to Israeli soldiers at the checkpoint.

In May 2005, a 15-year-old Palestinian boy was arrested at the checkpoint with two pipe bombs inside a black bag, apparently instructed to give them to someone in Israel. In November 2007, two Palestinian teenagers were detained for interrogation after they were found to be carrying three bombs; an Israeli sapper detonated them without incident. In September 2008, during Ramadan, a Palestinian woman threw acid at an Israeli soldier's face while she was passing through the checkpoint, leaving him blind in one eye. She was subsequently captured and arrested after trying to flee from the checkpoint.

== See also ==
- Checkpoint 300
- Israeli occupation of the West Bank
- Palestinian freedom of movement
- Transport in Palestine
- West Bank barrier
- West Bank closures
