= The Making of a Martyr =

- Directed by: Brooke Goldstein; Alistair Leyland
- Release date: 2006
- Country: Canada

The Making of a Martyr is a 2006 film made by Brooke Goldstein and Alistair Leyland.

== Story ==
On March 25, 2004, a 16-year-old boy Hussam Abdo, was apprehended at an Israeli border checkpoint with live explosives strapped around his waist. He was noticed running towards the checkpoint and was ordered to stop by Israeli soldiers. Instead of detonating the bomb, Hussam surrendered, and after the removal of his suicide belt, he was sent to a juvenile detention ward of an Israeli prison for attempted murder. Since the start of the Palestinian Intifada in 2000, an alarming number of suicide bombers have been children aged under 18. To explore this troubling phenomenon, filmmakers Brooke Goldstein and Alistair Leyland risked their lives and travelled to the Palestinian towns of Jenin, Ramallah, Tulkarem, and Nablus, seeking out and meeting with leaders of the organizations responsible for recruiting children for these suicide attacks. The directors found themselves with unprecedented access to Hussam's home in Nablus, with his mother, father and sister; to the Israeli prison where he is held; to Zakaria Zubeidi, commander of the al-Aqsa Martyrs' Brigades in Jenin; to Palestinian Television headquarters in Ramallah; to the Islamic Jihad Summer Academy in Tulkarem; and more. Their interviews are a window into the causes behind the recent phenomenon of child suicide bombers, and why Palestinian children make such decisions.

== Purpose ==
First-time director and attorney, Brooke Goldstein, made this film with the intent of facilitating the enforcement of Palestinian children's human rights, namely their right to life and to an education free of incitement. Director/Producer Alistair Leyland has been an advocate of providing exposure to human rights abuses for some time. Having spent time covering the "one child policy" in China and its effects on infant girls, Leyland knew the story of a 16-year-old Palestinian suicide bomber was both horrifying and complex.

It was after shooting tens of hours of interviews in the region that I finally realized these children are being preyed upon by higher powers. This issue needed to be addressed, his [Abdo's] story needed to be told.

— The Making of a Martyr's Director/Producer Alistair Leyland

== Awards ==
In April 2006, The Second Annual United Nations Documentary Film Festival honored The Making of a Martyr with the Audience Choice Award for Best Film. Brooke Goldstein and Alistair Leyland were on-site to accept their first award for this film.

Official selections include: Brooklyn International Film Festival (2007); Malibu International Film Festival (2007); Shoot-Me Film Festival (2007); Liberty Film Festival (2007); Whistler Film Festival (2006); Anchorage International Film Festival (2006); United Nations Documentary Film Exposition, London, England (2006); Shoot-Me Film Festival The Hague (2007).
