= Pierre Rehov =

French–Israeli documentary filmmaker, director, and novelist

Pierre Rehov (Hebrew: פייר רחוב; born 1952) is the pseudonym of a French–Israeli documentary filmmaker, director, and novelist, most known for his movies about the Arab–Israeli conflict and Israeli–Palestinian conflict, its treatment in the media, and about terrorism. Rehov is also a fiction writer, whose novels have enjoyed some success in France, and several have been translated into English and German.

== Life ==
Rehov was born to a Jewish family from Algiers, when Algeria was still a French department. He experienced terrorism at a young age when his school was the target of a terror attack conducted by the "FLN" (Algerian National Front of Liberation). In 1961, his family became a part of pieds-noirs (French people living in Algeria) fleeing from Algeria in fear of reprisal massacres by Algerians against their non-Muslim neighbors as the Algerian War ended and Algerian independence loomed.

Rehov says he was not any sort of activist until he saw the death of Muhammad al-Durrah on television, and doubted its authenticity – a claim later questioned in French courts to be defamatory in the case against Philippe Karsenty because, according to the Judges, "Karsenty didn't have the proof, in hands, that Palestinians actually killed the kid, when he was sued by the French TV channel France 2".

In January 2008, Rehov was embedded in the 4/1 US cavalry in Baghdad and Durah, where he filmed hours of dailies, showing the situation in Iraq from the field. Those images are part of his documentary The Path to Darkness. In 2008 Rehov moved to the United States due to what he described as a growing climate of antisemitism in France and the rest of Europe. Three years later, in November 2011, he moved to Tel Aviv, Israel, where he now lives.

As a journalist and commentator, he writes regularly in Le Figaro, Valeurs Actuelle, The Gatestone Institute, The Jerusalem Post and many political blogs, including Dreuz and Atlantico.

Rehov is married to Sharon Yambem, a Jewish immigrant to Israel from India. From a previous marriage he has a son, who lives in Singapore and a daughter who is an actress and lives in New York. A third child was born in 2022 from his second marriage.

== Filmography ==
- The Road to Jenin – a response to Jenin, Jenin, a controversial documentary produced by Mohammad Bakri, in order to portray what Bakri calls "the Palestinian truth" about the "Battle of Jenin". The film lists number of casualties acknowledged by both Palestinians and Israelis.
- The Trojan Horse – this film demonstrates that Yasser Arafat's true intentions were not a two-state solution, but a Palestinian state on the territory of all of Israel.
- Holy Land - Christians in Peril – a film which exposes the flight of Christians from PA-controlled lands.
- Silent Exodus – a film about the Jewish exodus from Arab lands.
- Hostages of Hatred – how the Palestinian right of return, supported by the UN, has left Palestinians in camps for half a century and, as Rehov argues, originated the present unsolvable situation in the Middle East.
- From The River to the Sea was voted Best Film at the 2006 Liberty Film Festival
- The War of Images
- Suicide Killers – 2006 documentary film that purports to explore the psychological condition of suicide bombers. Released in theaters, in New York and Los Angeles, and distributed on DVD by WEA, Suicide Killers was considered for the Hollywood Oscars but not nominated.
- First comes Saturday, then Comes Sunday – 2007 documentary film about the persecution of Christians under Islamic rule in the Middle East
- The Path to Darkness – 2011
- War Crimes in Gaza – 2015
- Beyond Deception Strategy – 2015
- Unveiling Jerusalem – 2017
- Behind the smokescreen" - 2018
- Pay for Slay - 2019
- Palestinian Apartheid - 2019
- The origins of the Palestinian Cause - 2019
- Terror, racket and corruption - 2019
- Palestine, the invention of a Nation - 2019
- The Sunday People - 2019
- Palestinian animal abuse - 2019
- Violence and discrimination - 2020
- Lies and tears - 2022 (A counter-investigation into Shireen Abu Akleh's death)
- Pogrom(s) - 2024 (An in-depth investigation into the October 7 massacre perpetrated by Hamas against more than 1,000 civilians in Israel, in the context of a worldwide revival of anti-Semitism stemming from an alliance between far-left movements and Islamists.)

Note: most his films are available on YouTube and CastR.

== Books ==
- Cellules Blanches – Published by the major French publisher, Albin Michel. Published in Germany under the title Wesse Zellen and in English under the title "Beyond Red Lines". Soon to be published in Spanish and Italian. A thriller about counter-terrorism.
- Tu seras si jolie - Published by Belfond. June 2018
- Ted - Published by "La Mécanique Générale". January 2019
- Beyond red lines - Published by "Thirty Trees". March 2020
- The Third Testament - Published by "Thirty Trees". July 2021
- 88 - Published by "Cosmopolis". February 2021
- Amnesia - Published by "Cosmopolis". March 2022
- Red Eden - Published by Thirty Trees. May 2022
- Nuit Américaine - Published by Cosmopolis. September 2022
- American Night - Published by Thirty Trees. February 2025
- 7 Octobre - La Riposte - (Co-author with Stephane Simon ) Published by Fayard. April 2025

== See also ==
- Media coverage of the Arab–Israeli conflict
- Pallywood
