= 1840 =

1840 in various calendars
- Gregorian calendar: 1840; MDCCCXL
- Ab urbe condita: 2593
- Armenian calendar: 1289; ԹՎ ՌՄՁԹ
- Assyrian calendar: 6590
- Balinese saka calendar: 1761–1762
- Bengali calendar: 1246–1247
- Berber calendar: 2790
- British Regnal year: 3 Vict. 1 – 4 Vict. 1
- Buddhist calendar: 2384
- Burmese calendar: 1202
- Byzantine calendar: 7348–7349
- Chinese calendar: 己亥年 (Earth Pig); 4537 or 4330 — to — 庚子年 (Metal Rat); 4538 or 4331
- Coptic calendar: 1556–1557
- Discordian calendar: 3006
- Ethiopian calendar: 1832–1833
- Hebrew calendar: 5600–5601
- Hindu calendars
- Vikram Samvat: 1896–1897
- Shaka Samvat: 1761–1762
- Kali Yuga: 4940–4941
- Holocene calendar: 11840
- Igbo calendar: 840–841
- Iranian calendar: 1218–1219
- Islamic calendar: 1255–1256
- Japanese calendar: Tenpō 11 (天保１１年)
- Javanese calendar: 1767–1768
- Julian calendar: Gregorian minus 12 days
- Korean calendar: 4173
- Minguo calendar: 72 before ROC 民前72年
- Nanakshahi calendar: 372
- Thai solar calendar: 2382–2383
- Tibetan calendar: ས་མོ་ཕག་ལོ་ (female Earth-Boar); 1966 or 1585 or 813 — to — ལྕགས་ཕོ་བྱི་བ་ལོ་ (male Iron-Rat); 1967 or 1586 or 814

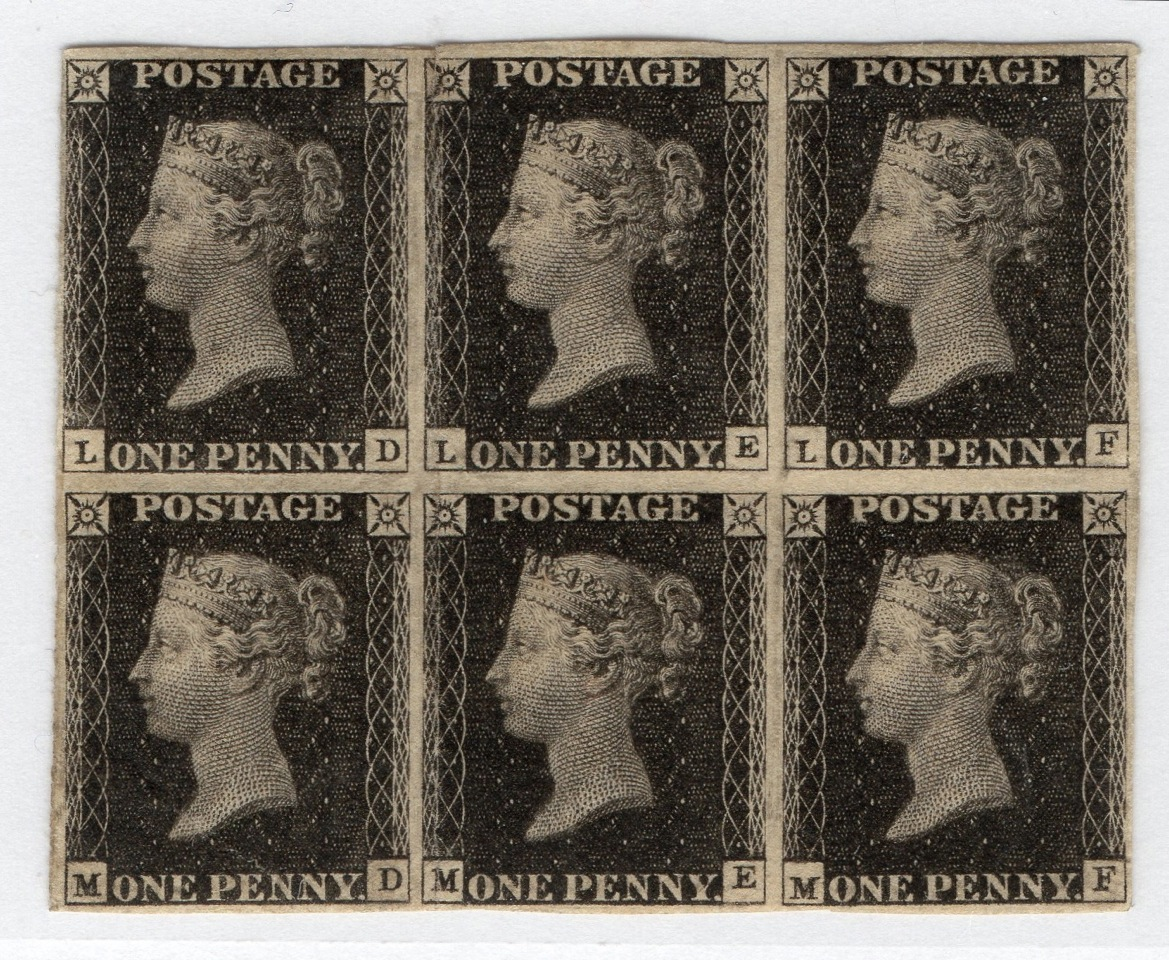
May 6: The world's first postage stamps are introduced.

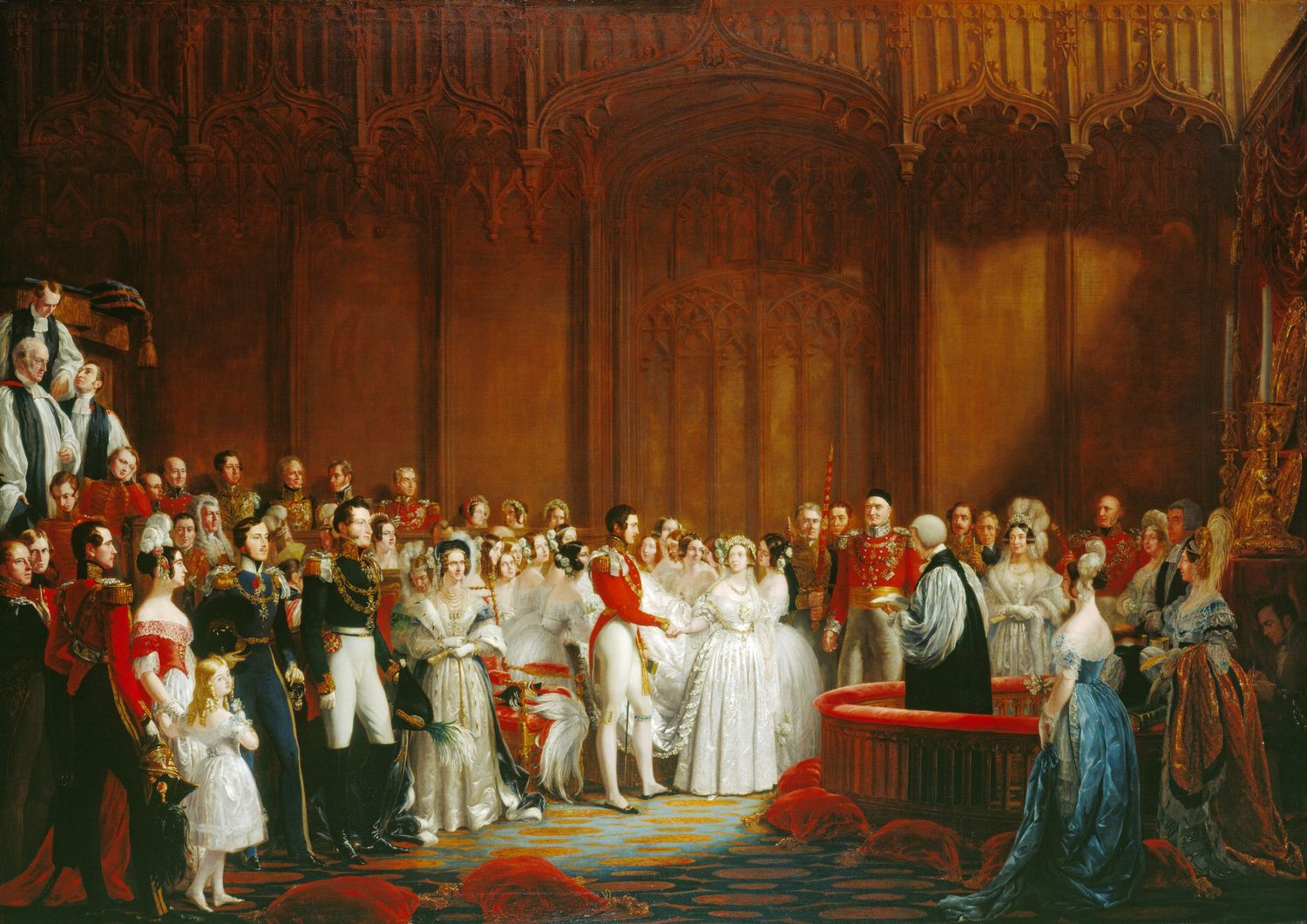
February 10: Queen Victoria of Britain marries Prince Albert of Saxe-Coburg and Gotha.

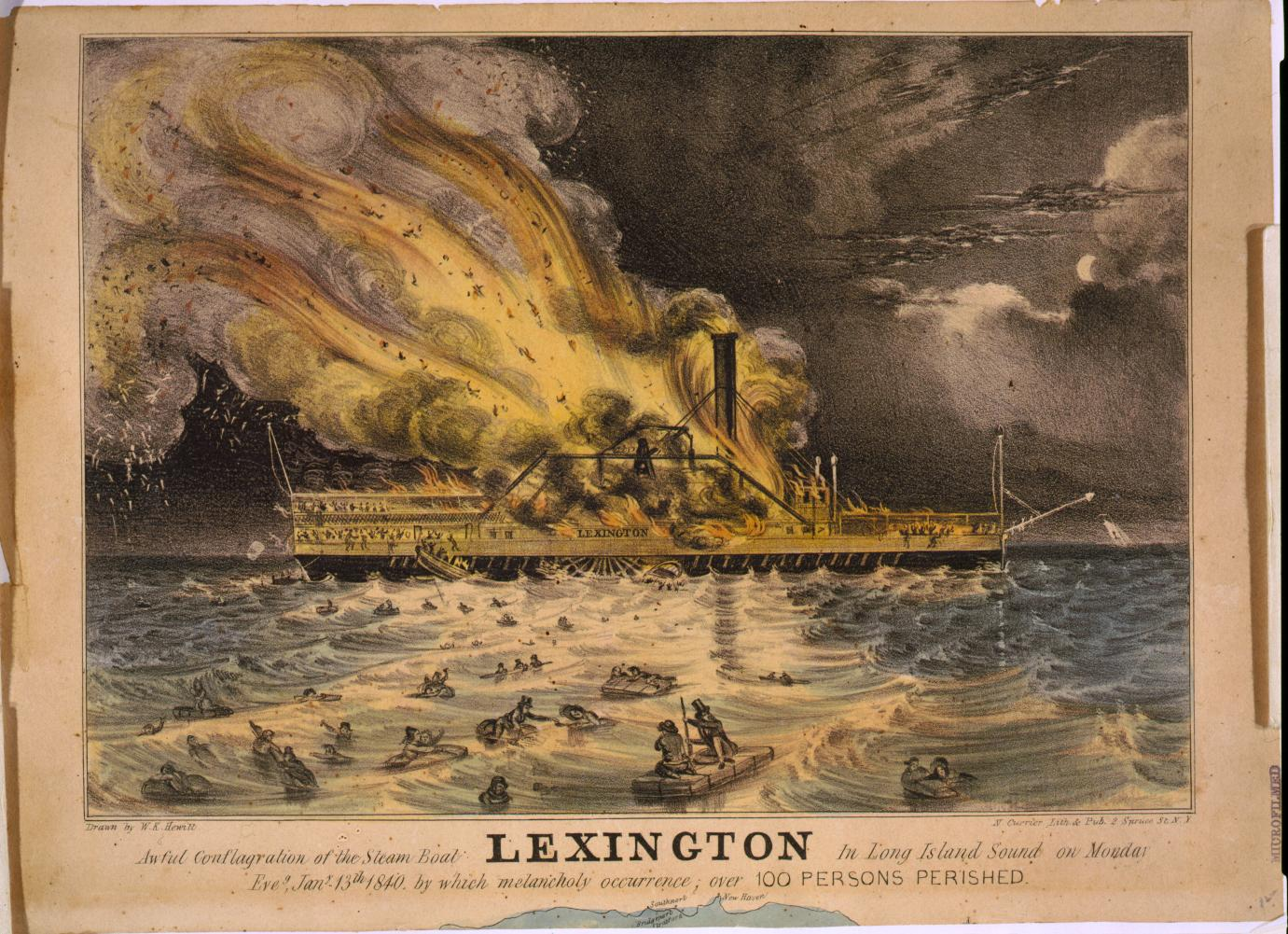
January 13: Steamship Lexington sinks.

1840 (MDCCCXL) was a leap year starting on Wednesday of the Gregorian calendar and a leap year starting on Monday of the Julian calendar, the 1840th year of the Common Era (CE) and Anno Domini (AD) designations, the 840th year of the 2nd millennium, the 40th year of the 19th century, and the 1st year of the 1840s decade. As of the start of 1840, the Gregorian calendar was 12 days ahead of the Julian calendar, which remained in localized use until 1923.

== Events ==
=== January–March ===
- January 3 – One of the predecessor papers of the Herald Sun of Melbourne, Australia, The Port Phillip Herald, is founded.
- January 10 – Uniform Penny Post is introduced in the United Kingdom.
- January 13 – The steamship Lexington burns and sinks in icy waters, four miles off the coast of Long Island; 139 die, only four survive.
- January 19 – Captain Charles Wilkes' United States Exploring Expedition sights what becomes known as Wilkes Land in the southeast quadrant of Antarctica, claiming it for the United States, and providing evidence that Antarctica is a complete continent.
- January 21 – Jules Dumont d'Urville discovers Adélie Land in Antarctica, claiming it for France.
- January 22 – British colonists reach New Zealand, officially founding the settlement of Wellington.
- February – The Rhodes blood libel is made against the Jews of Rhodes.
- February 5 – Damascus Affair: The murder of a Capuchin friar and his Greek servant leads to a highly publicized case of blood libel, against the Jews of Damascus.
- February 6 – The Treaty of Waitangi, granting British sovereignty in New Zealand, is signed.
- February 10 – Queen Victoria of the United Kingdom marries her cousin Prince Albert of Saxe-Coburg and Gotha.
- February 11 – Gaetano Donizetti's opera La fille du régiment premieres in Paris.
- March 1 – Adolphe Thiers becomes prime minister of France.
- March 4 – Alexander S. Wolcott and John Johnson open the world's first commercial photography portrait studio, their Daguerreian Parlor, on Broadway in Manhattan.
- March 9 – The Wilmington and Raleigh Railroad is completed, from Wilmington, North Carolina to Weldon, North Carolina. At 161.5 miles (259.9 km), it is the world's longest railroad.
- March 12 – Paweł Strzelecki reaches Australia's highest summit, Mount Kosciuszko.
- March 19 - The Council House Fight results in the deaths of 35 Comanche and seven Texas Rangers/militia, ending any hopes for peace in the Texas–Indian wars.

=== April–June ===
- April – The Raleigh and Gaston Railroad is completed from Raleigh to near Weldon, North Carolina.
- April 2 – The Washingtonian movement for teetotalism is founded by a group of alcoholics in Baltimore, Maryland.
- April 3 – Johnny Appleseed meets Abraham Lincoln, and plants apple trees in New York City.
- April 15 – King's College Hospital opens in London.
- May 1 – Britain issues the Penny Black, the world's first postage stamp; it becomes valid for the pre-payment of postage from May 6.
- May 7 – Great Natchez Tornado: A massive tornado strikes Natchez, Mississippi during the early afternoon. Before it is over, 317 people are killed and 109 injured (the second deadliest tornado in U.S. history).
- May 21 – New Zealand is declared a British colony.
- June 7 – On the death of Frederick William III of Prussia, he is succeeded on the throne of the Kingdom of Prussia (which he has ruled for more than 40 years) by his eldest son Frederick William IV.
- June 12–23 – The World Anti-Slavery Convention is organised by the British and Foreign Anti-Slavery Society, at Exeter Hall in London, England. Arguments over the exclusion of women from the convention have important ramifications for the movement for women's suffrage in the United States.
- June 18 – Maria massacre: British brigantine Maria is wrecked off South Australia. All 26 passengers and crew make it to the shore but none survive the trek to safety over the following two weeks, most being massacred by Aboriginal Australians.

=== July–September ===
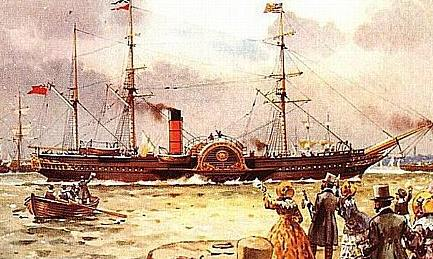
July 4: RMS Britannia

- July 4 – The Cunard Line's 700-ton wooden paddlewheel steamer RMS Britannia departs from Liverpool, bound for Halifax, Nova Scotia, on the first steam transatlantic passenger mail service.
- July 15 – The Austrian Empire, the United Kingdom, the Kingdom of Prussia and the Russian Empire sign the Convention of London with the Sublime Porte, ruler of the Ottoman Empire.
- July 21 – August Borsig's steam locomotive, the first built in Germany, competes against a Stephenson-built locomotive on the Berlin–Jüterbog railroad; the Borsig locomotive wins by 10 minutes.
- July 23
  - Pedro II is declared "of age" prematurely, and begins to reassert central control in Brazil.
  - The Province of Canada is created by the Act of Union, but not proclaimed until 10 February 1841.
- August 1 – Remaining former slaves in the British Empire are released from apprenticeships under terms of the Slavery Abolition Act 1833.
- August 10 – Fortsas hoax: A number of book collectors gather in Binche, Belgium, to attend a non-existent book auction of the late "Count of Fortsas".
- August 19 – The Battle of the Barrier.
- September 10 – Ottoman and British troops bombard Beirut, and land troops on the coast, to pressure Egyptian Muhammad Ali to retreat from the country.
- September 16 – Joseph Strutt hands over the deeds and papers concerning the Derby Arboretum, which is to become England's first public park.
- September 30 – The French frigate Belle Poule arrives in Cherbourg, bringing back the remains of Napoleon from Saint Helena to France.

=== October–December ===
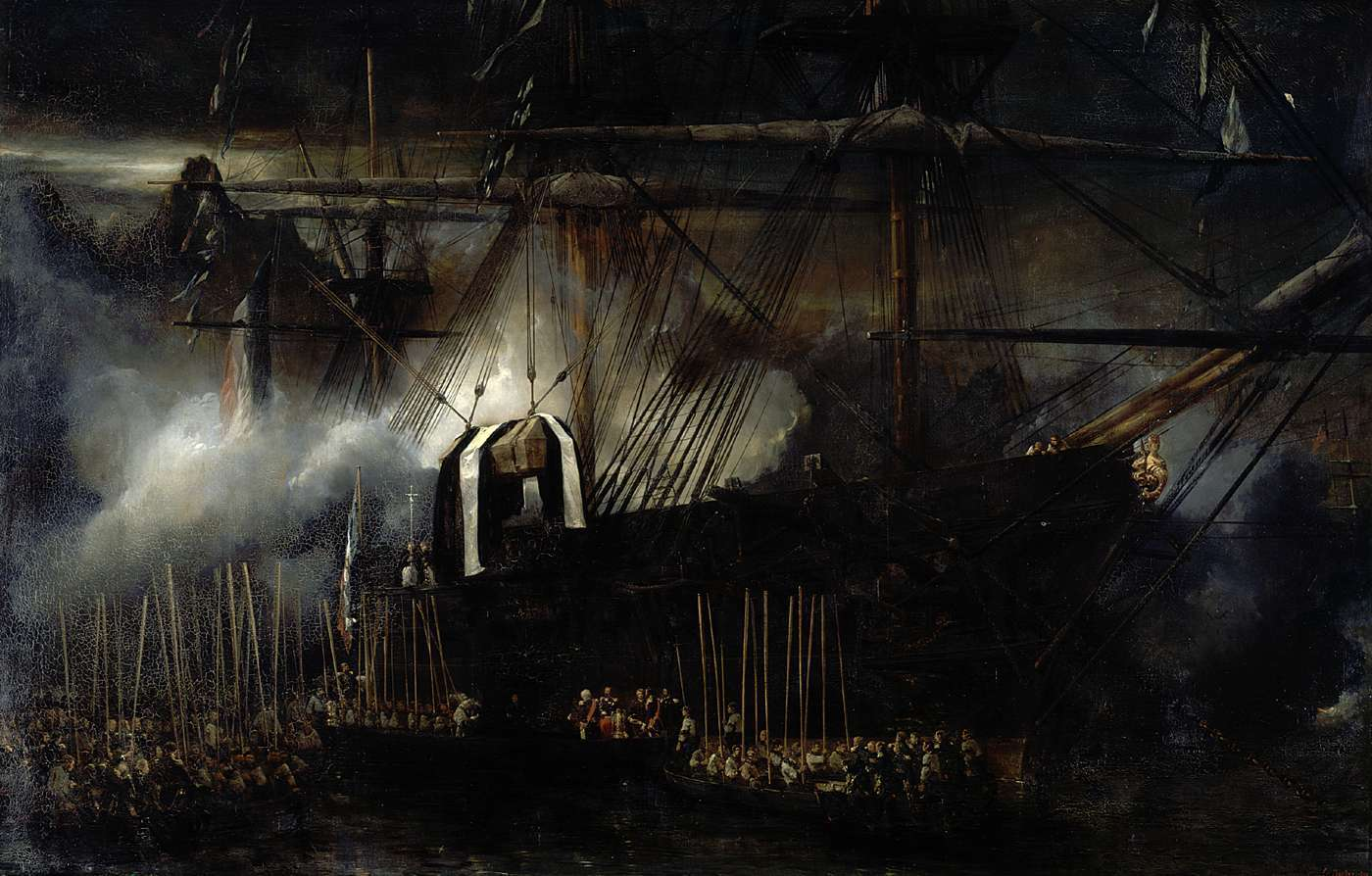
The frigate Belle Poule brings back the remains of Napoleon to France.

- October 7 – William II becomes King of the Netherlands.
- October 8 – A firman (imperial decree) of Sultan Abdulmejid I replaces Bashir Shihab II as Emir of Mount Lebanon with Prince Bashir Chehab III (Bashir Qasim al-Chehab).
- October 11 – Maronite leader Bashir Shihab II surrenders to the Ottomans, and on October 14 goes into exile, initially in Malta.
- November 4 – 1840 United States presidential election: William Henry Harrison defeats Martin Van Buren in a landslide.
- December 7 – David Livingstone leaves Britain for Africa.
- December 15 – The body of Napoleon is laid to rest in Les Invalides in Paris.
- December 21 – Stockport Viaduct is completed in North West England. It is one of the largest brick structures in Europe.

=== Date unknown ===
- The first English translation of Goethe's Theory of Colours by Charles Eastlake is published.
- The first known photograph of Niagara Falls, a daguerreotype, is taken by English chemist Hugh Lee Pattinson.
- Kajima, a construction company based in Japan, is founded in Edo (modern-day Tokyo).
- Approximate date – Volcanic eruption of Tinakula in the Solomon Islands causes the island to be depopulated.

=== Ongoing ===
- First Opium War (1839–1842)
- First Anglo-Afghan War (1839–1842)
- Egyptian–Ottoman War (1839–41)

== Births ==
=== January–March ===
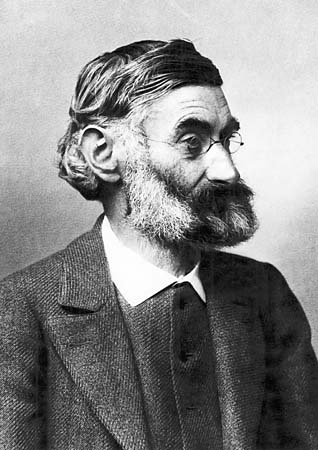
Ernst Abbe

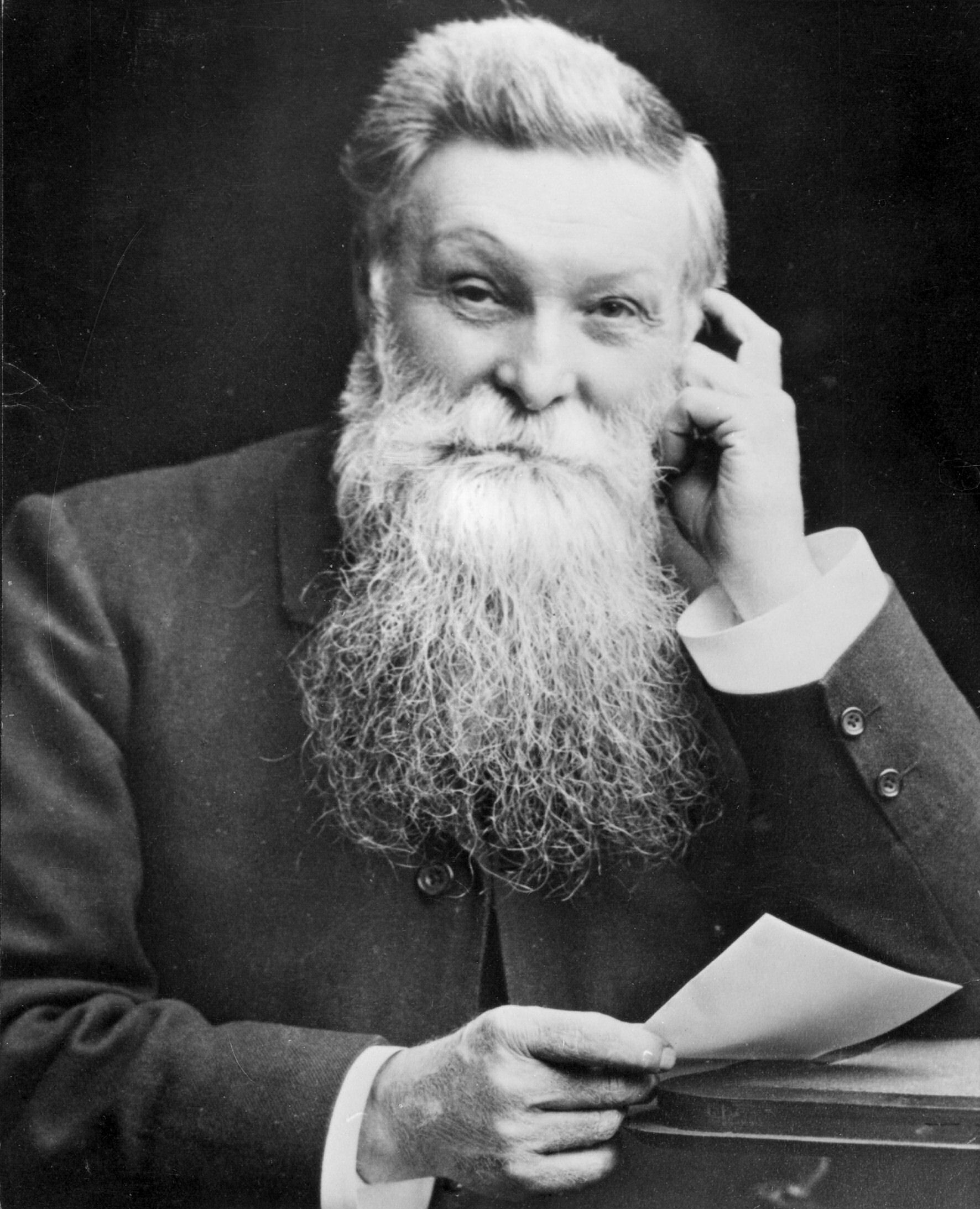
John Boyd Dunlop

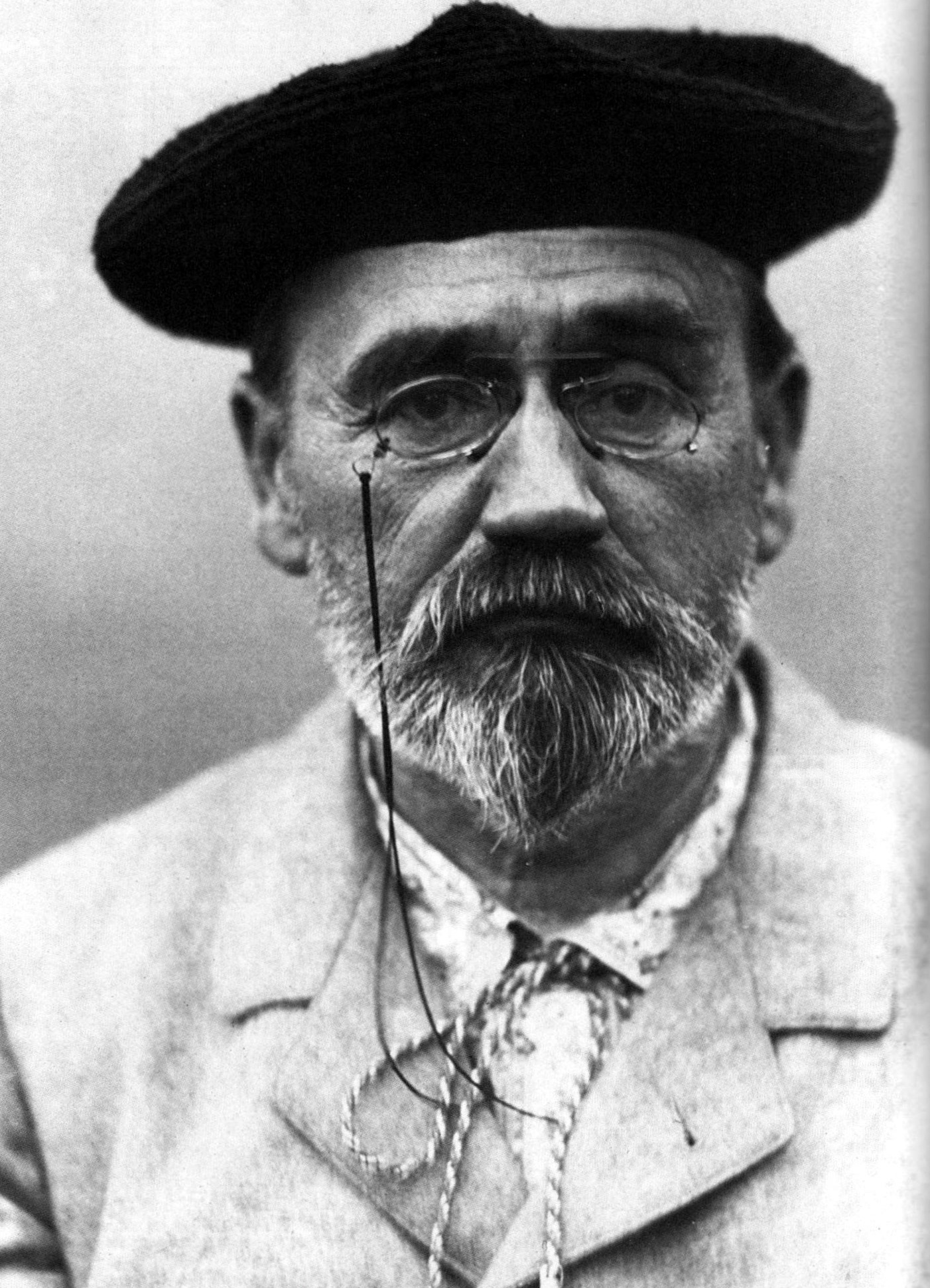
Émile Zola

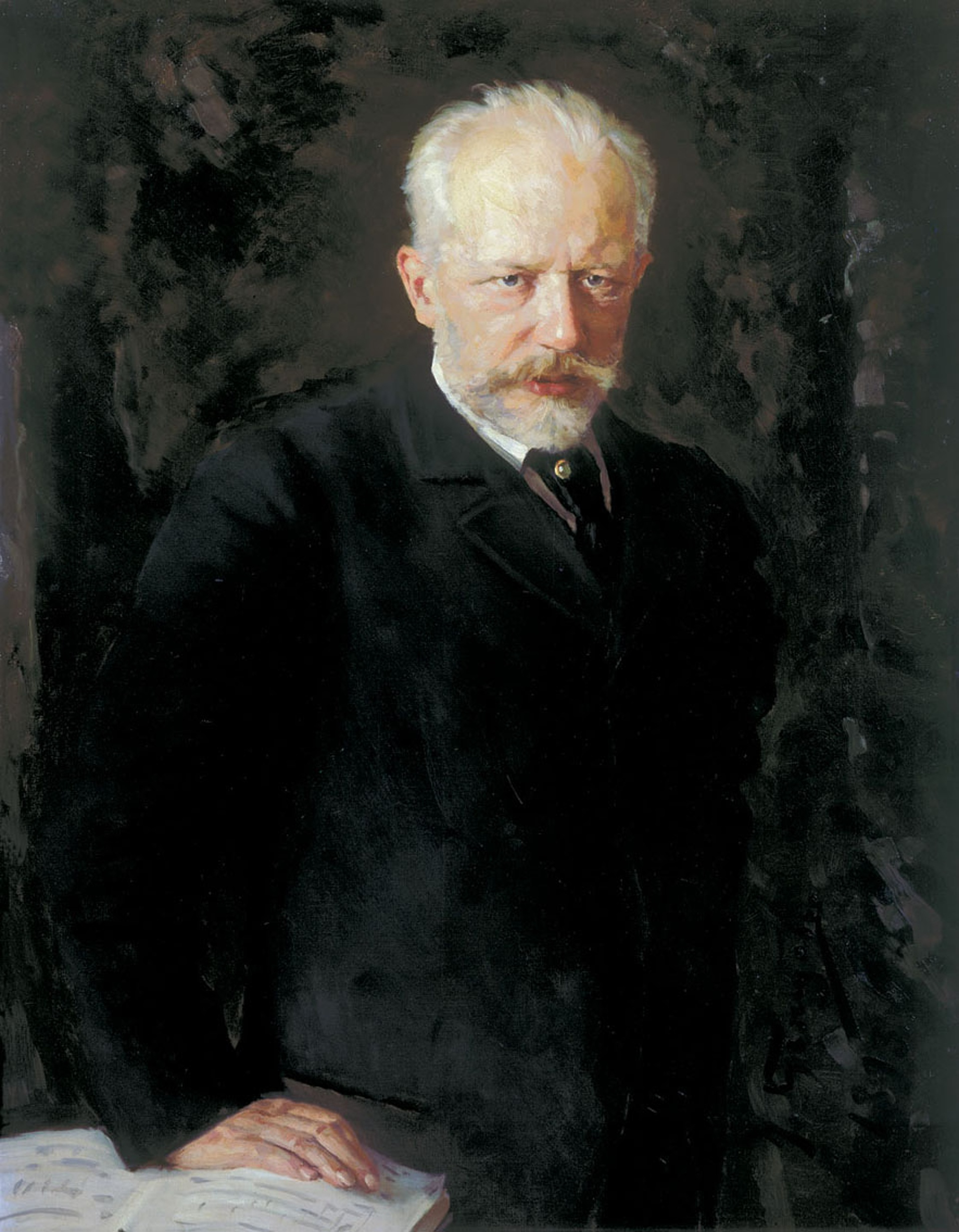
Pyotr Ilyich Tchaikovsky

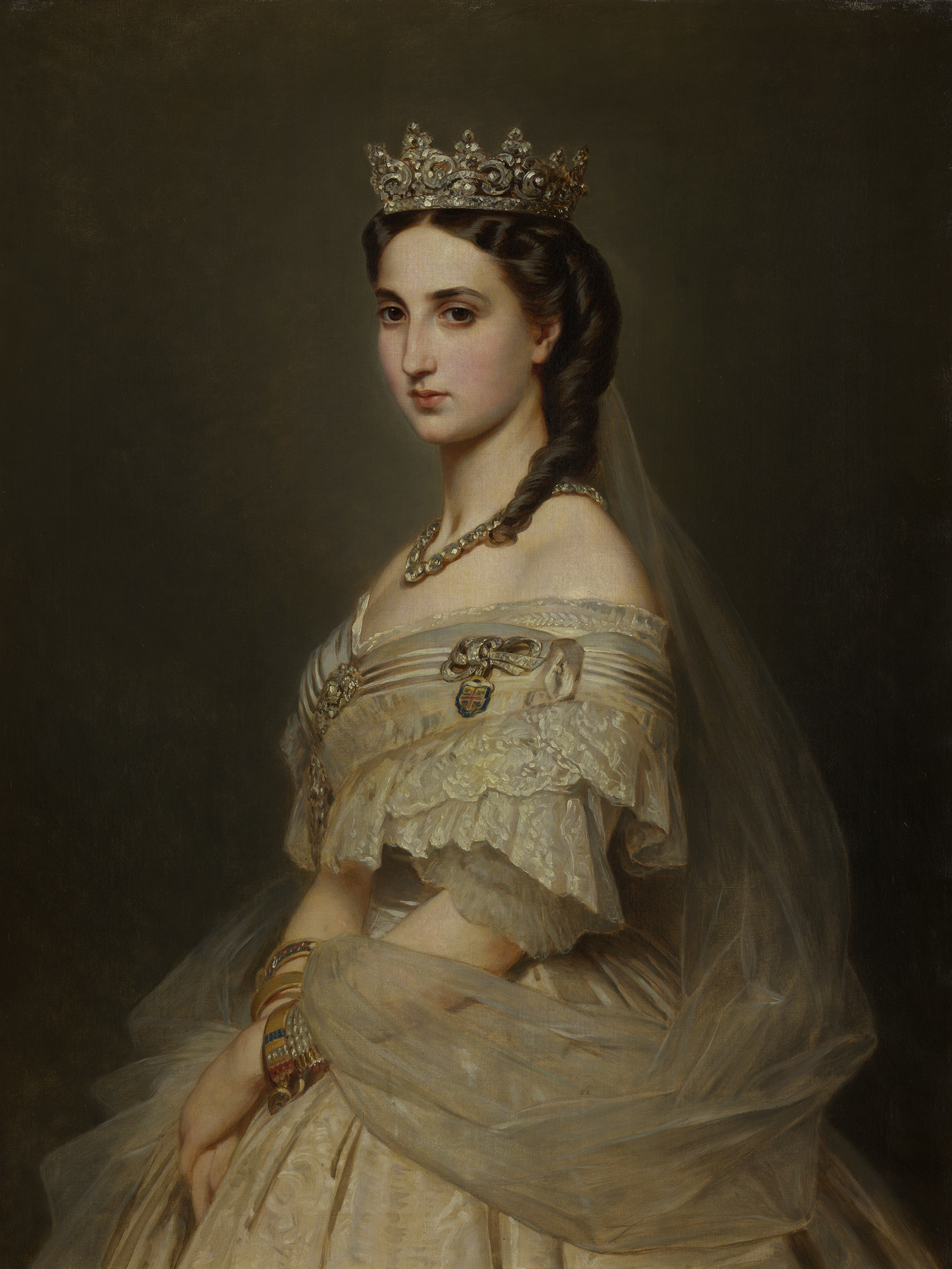
Empress Carlota of Mexico

- January 1 – Dugald Drummond, Scottish-born railway locomotive designer (d. 1912)
- January 3 – Father Damien, Belgian missionary priest (d. 1889)
- January 9 – Samuel Baldwin Marks Young, American general, first Chief of Staff of the United States Army (d. 1924)
- January 18 – Alfred Percy Sinnett, English writer and theosophist (d. 1921)
- January 19 – Dethloff Willrodt, American Civil War veteran and politician (d. 1932)
- January 21 – Sophia Jex-Blake, English physician (d. 1912)
- January 22 – Ernest Wilberforce, English bishop (d. 1907)
- January 23 – Ernst Abbe, German physicist (d. 1905)
- February 5
  - John Boyd Dunlop, Scottish-born inventor (d. 1921)
  - Hiram Maxim, American-born British firearms inventor (d. 1916)
- February 9 – William T. Sampson, American admiral (d. 1902)
- February 15 – Titu Maiorescu, 23rd Prime Minister of Romania (d. 1917)
- February 21 – Murad V, 33rd Ottoman Sultan (d. 1904)
- February 22 – August Bebel, German politician (d. 1913)
- February 23 – Carl Menger, Austrian economist (d. 1921)
- February 29 – John Philip Holland, Irish inventor of the submarine (d. 1914)
- March 8 – Eduard von Knorr, German admiral (d. 1920)
- March 28 – Emin Pasha, German doctor, African administrator (d. 1892)
- March 31 – Sir Benjamin Baker, English civil engineer (d. 1907)

=== April–June ===
- April 2 – Émile Zola, French writer (d. 1902)
- April 11 – Robert Wentworth Little, British occultist (d. 1878)
- April 22 – Odilon Redon, French painter (d. 1916)
- April 27 – Edward Whymper, English mountaineer (d. 1911)
- April 30 – Edward Seymour, British admiral (d. 1929)
- May 7 – Pyotr Ilyich Tchaikovsky, Russian composer (d. 1893)
- May 10 – Eliza Trask Hill, American activist, journalist, philanthropist (d. 1908)
- May 13 – Alphonse Daudet, French writer (d. 1897)
- June 2
  - Thomas Hardy, English writer (d. 1928)
  - Émile Munier, French artist (d. 1895)
- June 7 – Carlota of Mexico, Empress of Mexico (d. 1927)
- June 9 – Jennie Casseday, American philanthropist (d. 1893)
- June 10 – Theodor Philipsen, Danish painter (d. 1920)
- June 13 – Augusta Lundin, Swedish fashion designer (d. 1919)
- June 21 – Edward Stanley Gibbons, English philatelist, founder of Stanley Gibbons Ltd. (d. 1913)

=== July–September ===
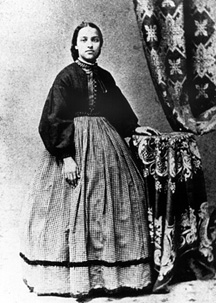
Mary Jane Patterson

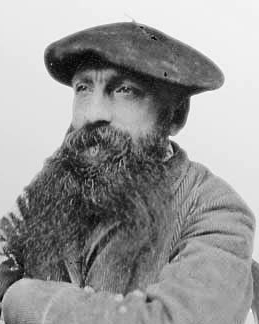
Auguste Rodin

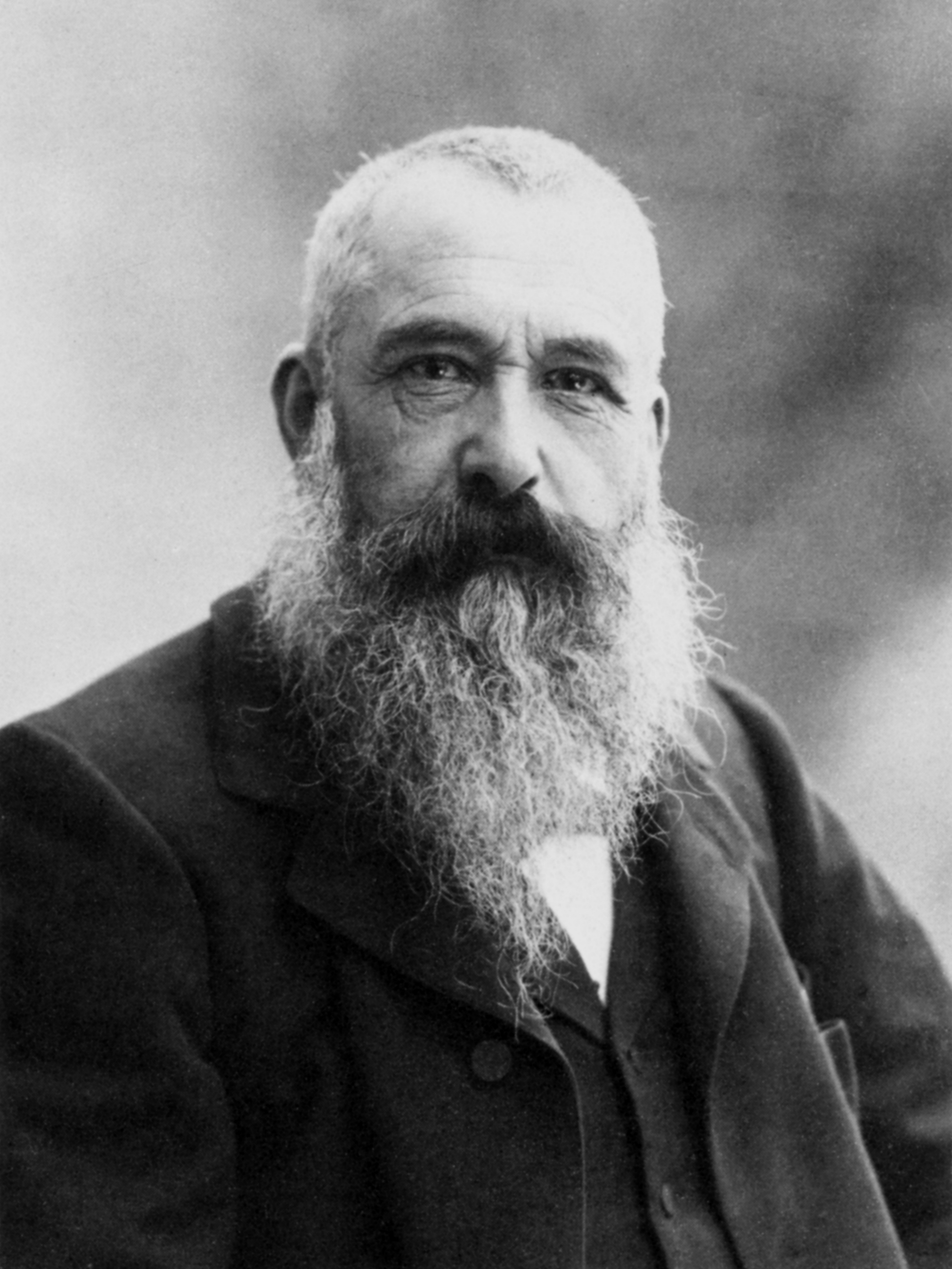
Claude Monet

- July 1 – Edward Clodd, English banker, writer and anthropologist (d. 1930)
- July 6 – Peter Conover Hains, major general in the United States Army and veteran of three wars (d. 1921)
- August 1 – Franz Simandl, Double bassist and pedagogue (d. 1912)
- August 4 – Richard von Krafft-Ebing, German sexologist (d. 1902)
- September 12 – Mary Jane Patterson, the first African-American woman to receive a B.A. degree in 1862. (d. 1894)
- September 22 – D. M. Canright, American Seventh-day Adventist minister and author, later one of the church's severest critics (d. 1919)
- September 25 – William N. Roach, American politician and member of the United States Senate from 1893 to 1899 (d. 1902)
- September 27
  - Alfred Thayer Mahan, United States Navy admiral, American geostrategist and historian (d. 1914)
  - Thomas Nast, American caricaturist, cartoonist (d. 1902)

=== October–December ===
- October 9 – Simeon Solomon, British artist (d. 1905)
- October 12 – Helena Modjeska, Polish stage actress (d. 1909)
- October 16 – Kuroda Kiyotaka, 2nd Prime Minister of Japan (d. 1900)
- November 7 – H. G. Haugan, Norwegian-born American railroad and banking executive (d. 1921)
- November 12 – Auguste Rodin, French sculptor (d. 1917)
- November 14 – Claude Monet, French painter (d. 1926)
- November 21 – Victoria, Princess Royal (d. 1901)
- November 29 – Rhoda Broughton, Welsh writer (d. 1920)
- December 17 – Nozu Michitsura, Japanese general (d. 1908)
- December 21 – Namık Kemal, Turkish poet (d. 1888)

=== Unknown date ===
- earliest probable date – Crazy Horse (Tȟašúŋke Witkó), Chief of the Oglala Lakota (k. 1877)

== Deaths ==
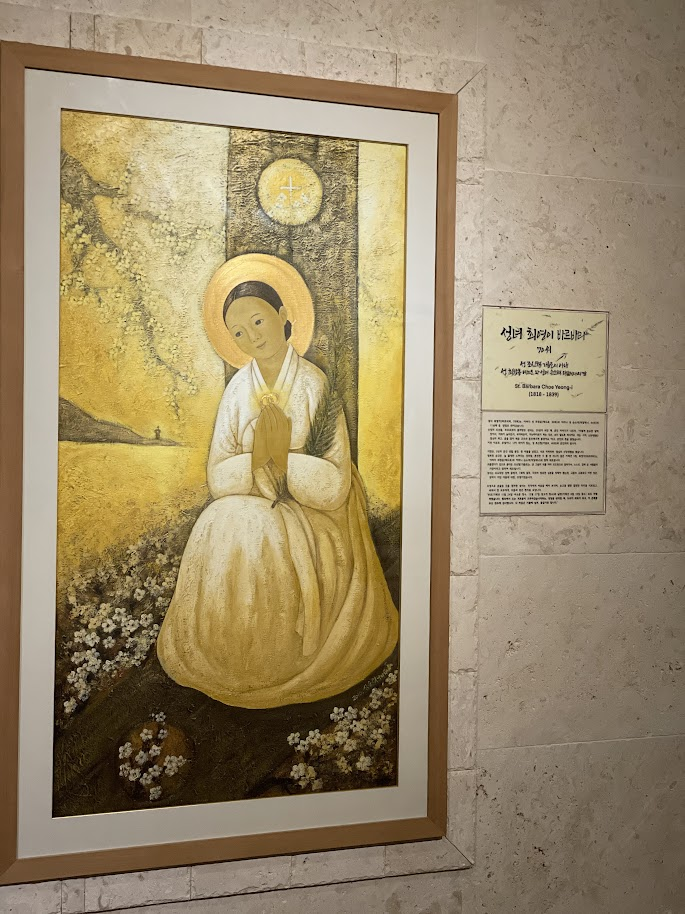
Saint Barbara Choe Yong-i

=== January–June ===
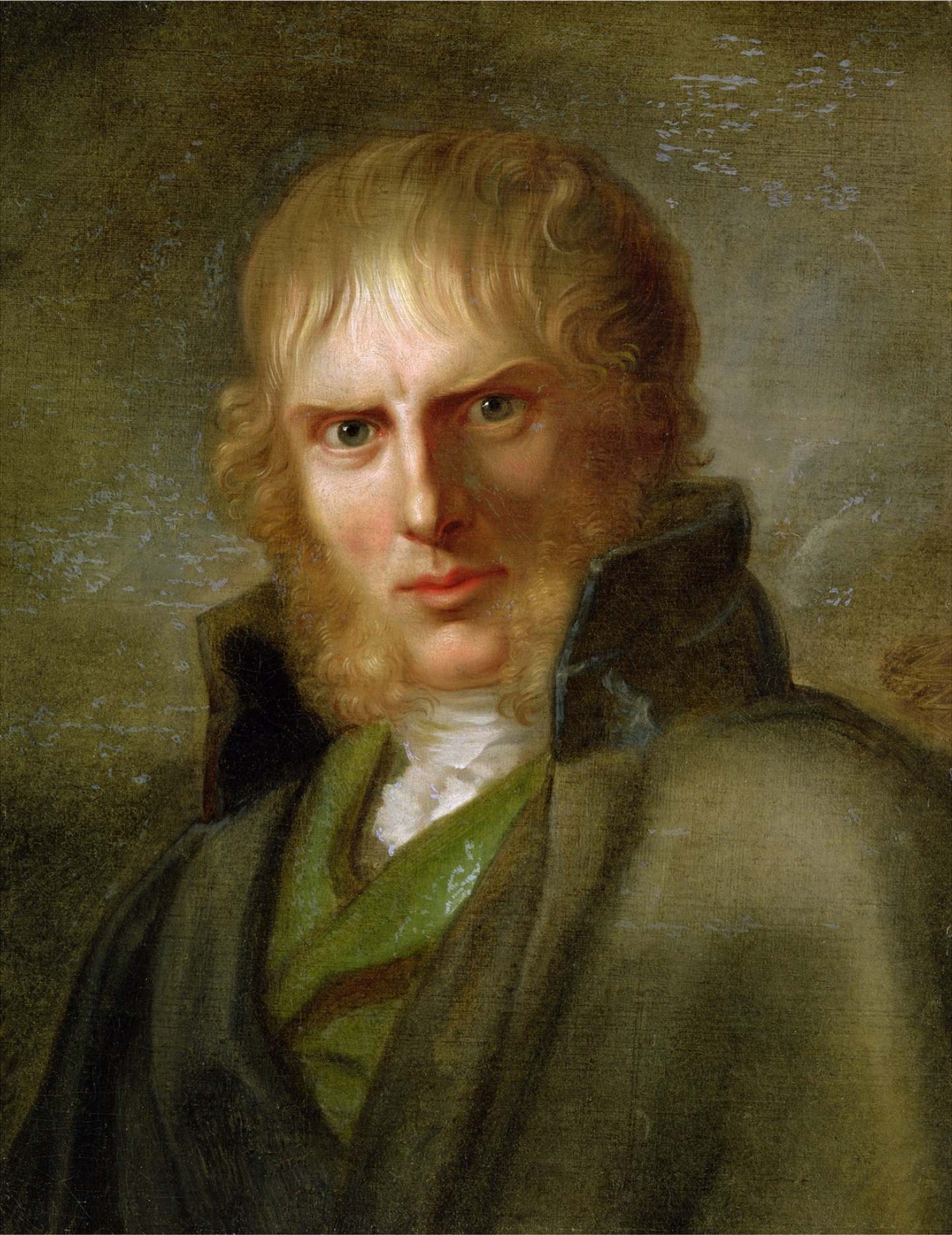
Caspar David Friedrich

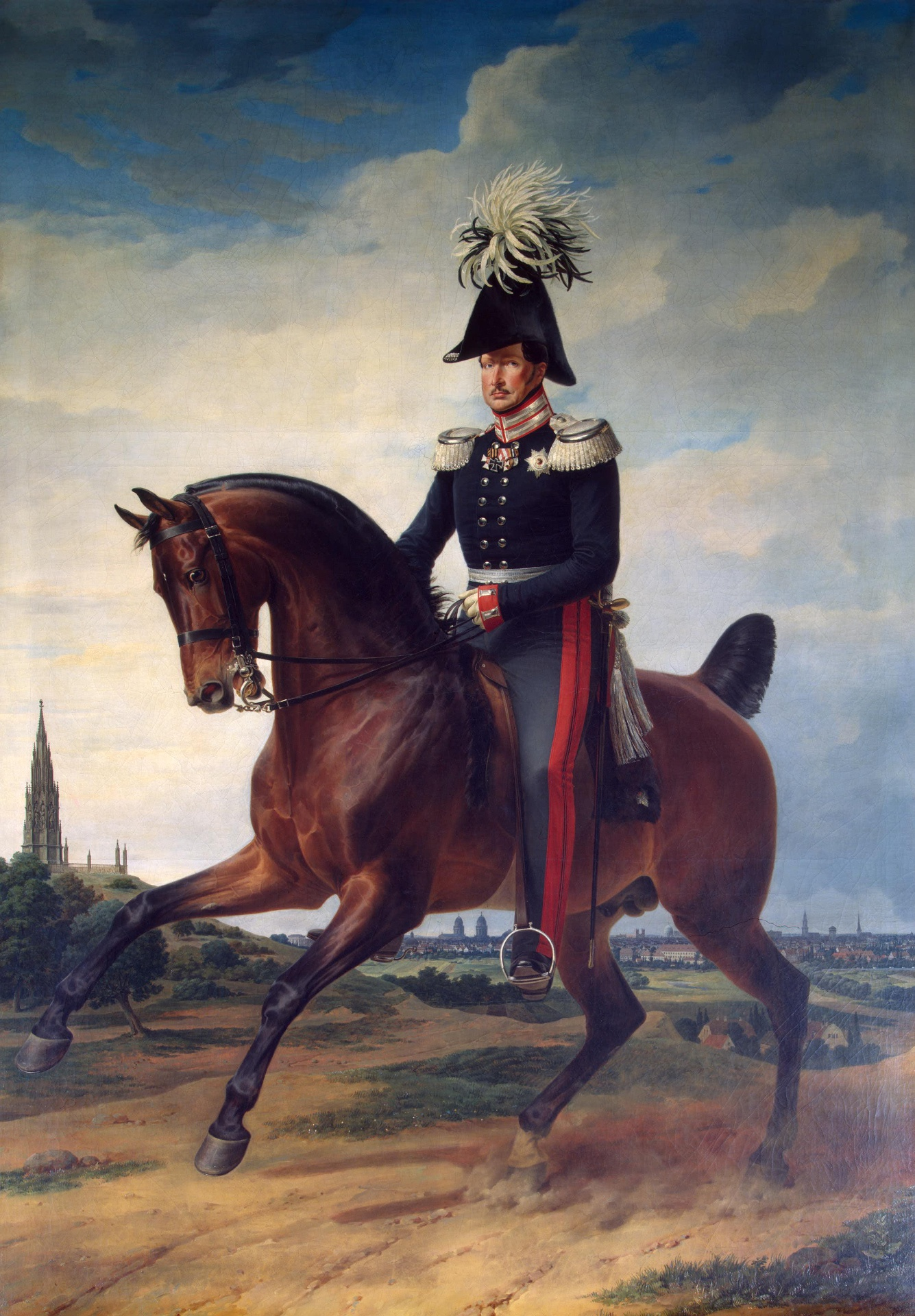
Frederick William III of Prussia

- January 6 – Fanny Burney, English novelist (b. 1752)
- January 22 – Johann Friedrich Blumenbach, German anthropologist (b. 1752)
- February 1 – Saint Barbara Choe Yong-i, Korean Roman Catholic martyr (b. 1819)
- February 13 – Nicolas Joseph Maison, French marshal, Minister of War (b. 1770)
- March 11 – George Wolf, American politician (b. 1777)
- March 17 – Lady Lucy Whitmore, English noblewoman and hymnwriter (b. 1792)
- April 12 – Franz Anton von Gerstner, Austrian railway engineer (b. 1796)
- April 25 – Siméon Denis Poisson, French mathematician, geometer, and physicist (b. 1781)
- May 1 – Joseph Williamson, builder of the Williamson Tunnels (b. 1769)
- May 6
  - Demetrius Augustine Gallitzin, Russian aristocrat, priest (b. 1770)
  - Francisco de Paula Santander, President of Colombia (b. 1792)
- May 7 – Caspar David Friedrich, German artist (b. 1774)
- May 13 – Leonard Gyllenhaal, Swedish military officer, entomologist (b. 1752)
- May 14 – Carl Ludvig Engel, German-Finnish architect (b. 1778)
- May 26 – Sidney Smith, British admiral (b. 1764)
- May 25 – Louisa Capper, English writer, philosopher and poet (b. 1776)
- May 27 – Niccolò Paganini, Italian violinist, composer (b. 1782)
- May 30 – Dominique Jacques de Eerens, Governor-General of the Dutch East Indies (b. 1781)
- June 7 – King Frederick William III of Prussia (b. 1770)

=== July–December ===
- July 7 – Nikolai Stankevich, Russian philosopher, poet (b. 1813)
- July 14 – Sir George Pocock, 1st Baronet, English politician and peer (died 1840)
- August 25 – Karl Leberecht Immermann, German novelist, dramatist (b. 1796)
- September 11 – John Gabriel Perboyre, French Catholic missionary, martyr in China (b. 1802)
- September 14 – Joseph Smith, Sr., American father of Joseph Smith, Jr. (b. 1771)
- September 18 – Constantine Samuel Rafinesque, Constantinople-born French polymath (b. 1783)
- September 20 – José Gaspar Rodríguez de Francia, first leader of independent Paraguay (b. 1766)
- September 22 – Anne Lister, English landowner, diarist, mountaineer and traveller, "the first modern lesbian" (b. 1791)
- November 2 – Józef Kossakowski (colonel), Polish-Lithuanian statesman (b. 1771)
- December 11 – Emperor Kōkaku of Japan (b. 1771)

=== Unknown date ===
- Haji Shariatullah, Bengali Islamic scholar (b. 1781)
