= The Old Stableyard, Liverpool =

Coordinates: 53.403955°N 2.958962°W

The Old Stableyard is a brownfield site located on Smithdown Lane in the Edge Hill area of Liverpool, England. It was once one of the main stableyards for Liverpool Corporation, but is now a development site and partly redeveloped as the location of The Williamson Tunnels Heritage Centre.

== History ==
The stableyard came into the possession of Liverpool Corporation in 1858. In 1867, with the appointment of a veterinary surgeon and shire horse enthusiast, Richard Reynolds, became one of several 'stud' stables owned by the corporation, Reynolds having persuaded the city fathers that keeping and breeding their own horses was cheaper and more efficient than relying on private contractors.

The Central Stables at one time accommodated upwards of 50 horses, ranging from ponies to the shires for which the City of Liverpool was famous in the early years of the 20th century. The duties of these horses covered everything from transporting mail and Corporation personnel around the city to moving the heaviest of loads.

In 1924 two horses belonging to Liverpool Corporation, 'Vesuvius' and 'Umber', appeared at the British Empire exhibition at Wembley and from a standing start pulled a load estimated at 50 tons. This record has never been equaled or beaten and the two geldings received a heroes' welcome when they returned to Liverpool.

The Central Stables was home to some of Liverpool Council's horses until 1960 when the last of the working horses was phased out. From then onwards the yard was home to the motorised bin wagons of the Corporation Cleansing department and a few horses retained to pull the City of Liverpool State Coach on grand civic occasions. The Central Stables were finally closed in 1993 and put on the market as a prime development opportunity, but they had not seen their last horse – in late April 2000 they were used briefly to house overnighting horses from around Britain for the Millennium Liverpool May Horse Parade. A horse named Pops was also stabled there for a while from 2003 whilst in the care of the Tunnels project.
