= Williamson Tunnels =

Series of 19th-century subterranean excavations in Liverpool, England

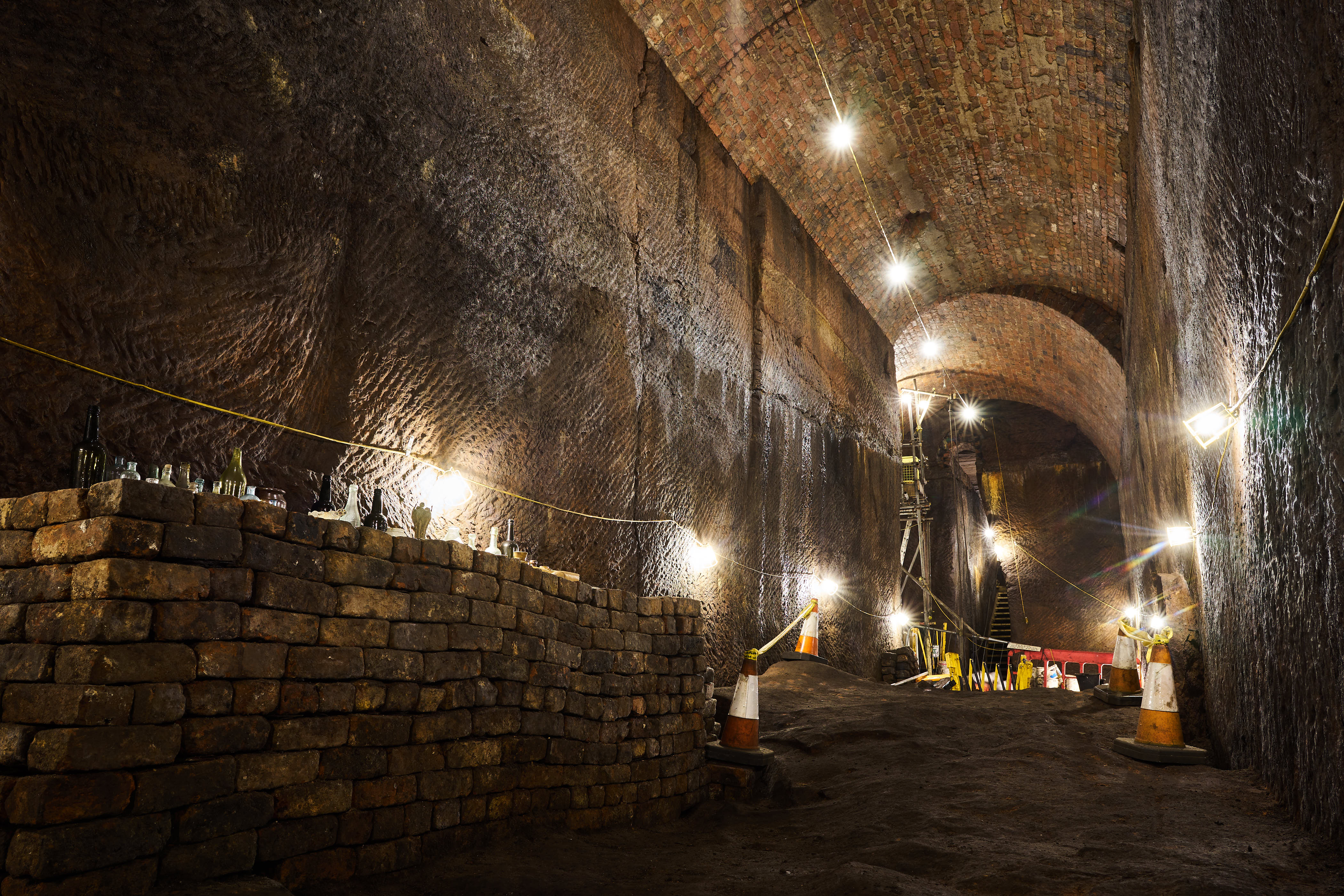
- The Banqueting Hall chamber beneath Joseph Williamson's house.

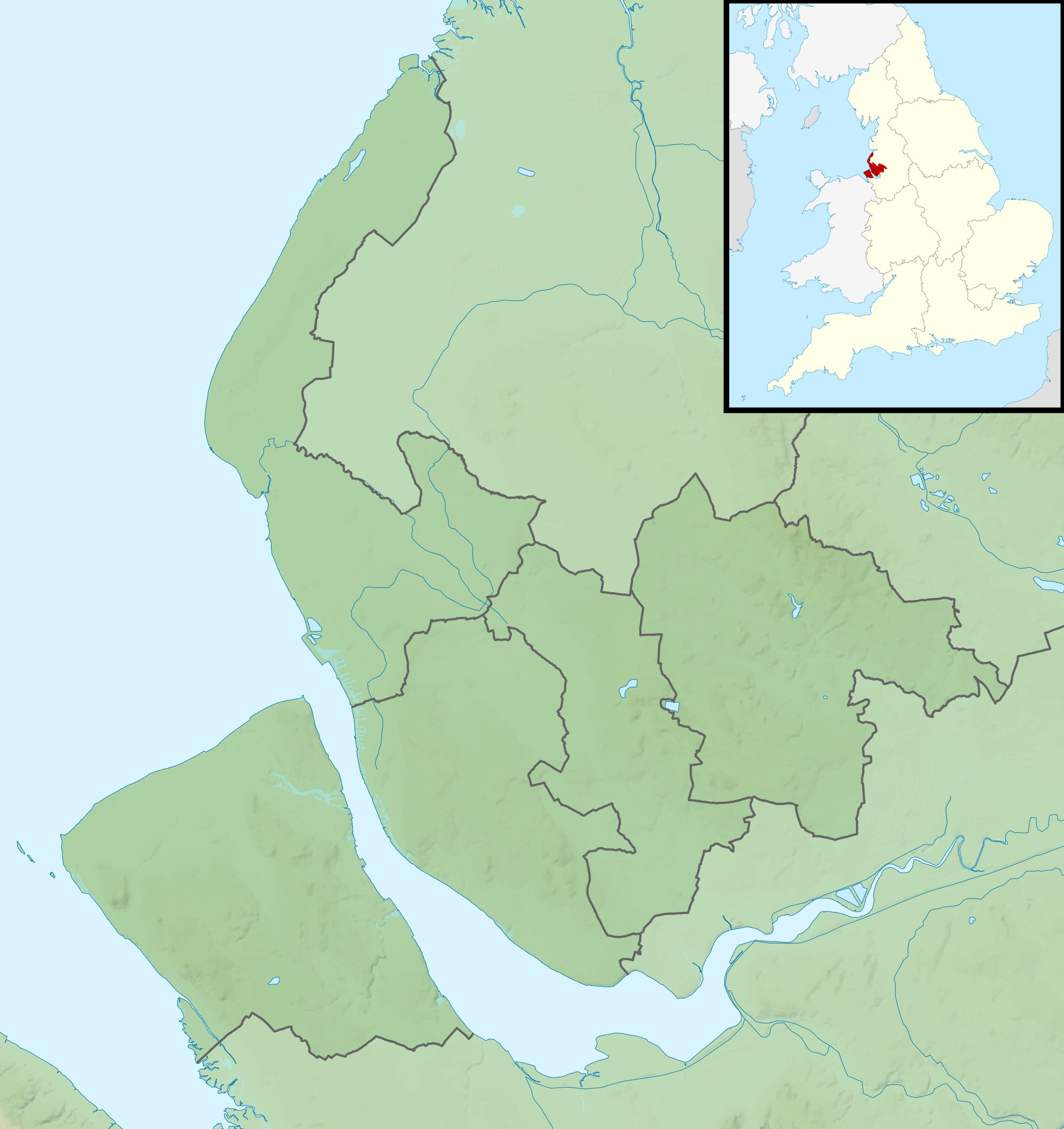
- Location within Merseyside
- 53.404775°N 2.958839°W
- Type: Excavations; possible sandstone quarries, or subterranean folly
- Location: Edge Hill, Liverpool

History
- Built: 1810–1840

Site notes
- Architect: Joseph Williamson
- Restored: 1995–present
- Restored by: Friends Of Williamson's Tunnels; Joseph Williamson Society

The Williamson Tunnels are a series of extensive subterranean excavations in the Edge Hill area of Liverpool, England. They are thought to have been created under the direction of tobacco merchant, landowner and philanthropist Joseph Williamson between 1810 and 1840. Although popularly described as "tunnels", the majority comprise brick or stone vaulting over excavations in the underlying sandstone. The purpose of the works remains unclear and continues to be a subject of heavy speculation; suggestions include commercial quarrying, a philanthropic desire to provide employment, and Williamson's own eccentric interests.

After being gradually infilled with rubble and spoil during the late 19th and early 20th centuries, they remained largely inaccessible until archaeological investigations were carried out in 1995. Since then volunteers have rediscovered and excavated an extensive network of tunnels, chambers and voids across several sites, with sections open to the public. Guided tours are available at the Williamson Tunnels Heritage Centre and the Friends of Williamson's Tunnels, and volunteers continue to uncover new sections.

== History ==
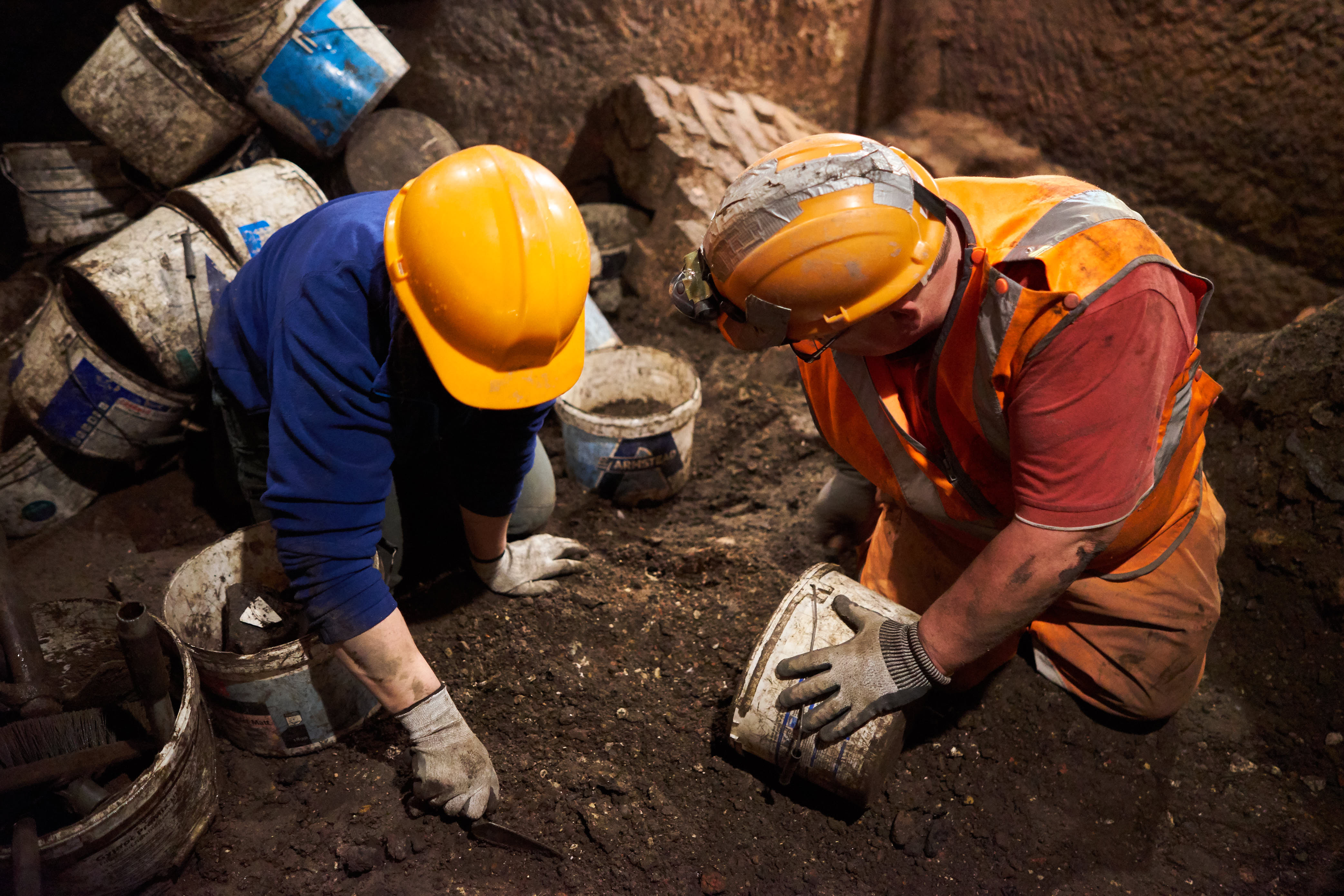
FoWT volunteers digging in a newly-discovered section of tunnel, May 2019.

In 1805, wealthy businessman Joseph Williamson acquired an area of land in Mason Street, Edge Hill, Liverpool, which was then a largely undeveloped outcrop of sandstone with a scattering of scars from small-scale quarrying. The land was held under a lease from the West Derby Waste Commissioners, who retained rights to the minerals under it: Williamson started to build houses on the site, which then adjoined growing and fashionable areas of Liverpool.

According to the account of a 19th-century Liverpool antiquarian, James Stonehouse, these houses were eccentric in design and "of the strangest description" without any rational plans. The ground behind them dropped sharply, and in order to provide large gardens Williamson built arched terraces over which the gardens could be extended. He continued to erect and alter many further buildings on the site during the period, including a large house in Mason Street occupied by himself and his wife. To carry out the work he recruited a large pool of labour from among the poor and needy of the area, including soldiers left unemployed at the end of the Napoleonic War; according to Stonehouse, he occasionally engaged them to carry out apparently pointless tasks, such as moving rubble from one place to another, then back again.

Over the same period, his workers also excavated a series of brick-arched tunnels and vaults at various depths within the sandstone. They covered a wide area, extending to the boundaries of Williamson's lease and possibly beyond. Stonehouse, who traversed parts of the tunnels in 1845, described the excavations as a labyrinth of "vaulted passages [...] pits deep, and yawning chasms", including a "fearful opening" beneath Grinfield Street with two "complete four-roomed houses" in the side of it connected by a spiral passage. This apparent tunnel-building activity continued until Williamson's death in 1840. In August 1867 the Liverpool Porcupine described the tunnels as being "a great nuisance" because drains ran straight into them, in one place creating a cess pool full of offensive water 15 feet (5 m) deep, and they were being used for dumping refuse, including down chutes built into the buildings above for the purpose.

In the later 19th century the Corporation of Liverpool began backfilling the tunnels with rubble and other waste from building demolition, a process that continued sporadically into the 20th century. Little information about the excavations had been recorded and nearly all knowledge of them, and of Williamson's life in general, was derived from the 1845 account of James Stonehouse. Although not published at the time it was written, it was referenced in Stonehouse's later works and was finally reprinted in full by Charles Hand as part of a 1916 article, "Joseph Williamson, the King of Edge Hill", published in the Transactions of the Lancashire and Cheshire Historical Society. Hand's work saw a brief revival of interest in Williamson and his life.

== Early investigations and archaeology ==
In 1881, the North Staffordshire Institute of Mining and Mechanical Engineers conducted a field trip to Liverpool during which they surveyed some of the surviving excavations, producing a plan and dog-leg section of the main parts of the site.

In the early 20th century, soldiers from the 1st Lancashire Engineers and the West Lancashire Territorial Forces Association, whose drill hall in Mason Street stood on top of one of the tunnels, carried out additional surveys. The Association produced a map of the excavations although, as many were filled with rubble, this had to be left incomplete. The map also showed the course of the London and North Western Railway cutting between Edge Hill and Lime Street stations which ran through the area.

Public interest in the tunnels waned through much of the 20th century and many of the sites were further buried or destroyed by new construction. However, from the 1980s onwards interest in Williamson steadily increased, leading to the formation of the two major societies and, eventually, excavation of tunnels across several sites. In 1995 a geology student from Liverpool University carried out a micro-gravity survey of the site. Some of his findings were ambiguous, perhaps due to rubble infill, and not all of them seemed to correspond with those of the Forces Association's 1907 map. Later that year a professional firm, Parkman, carried out a survey on behalf of the Joseph Williamson Society.

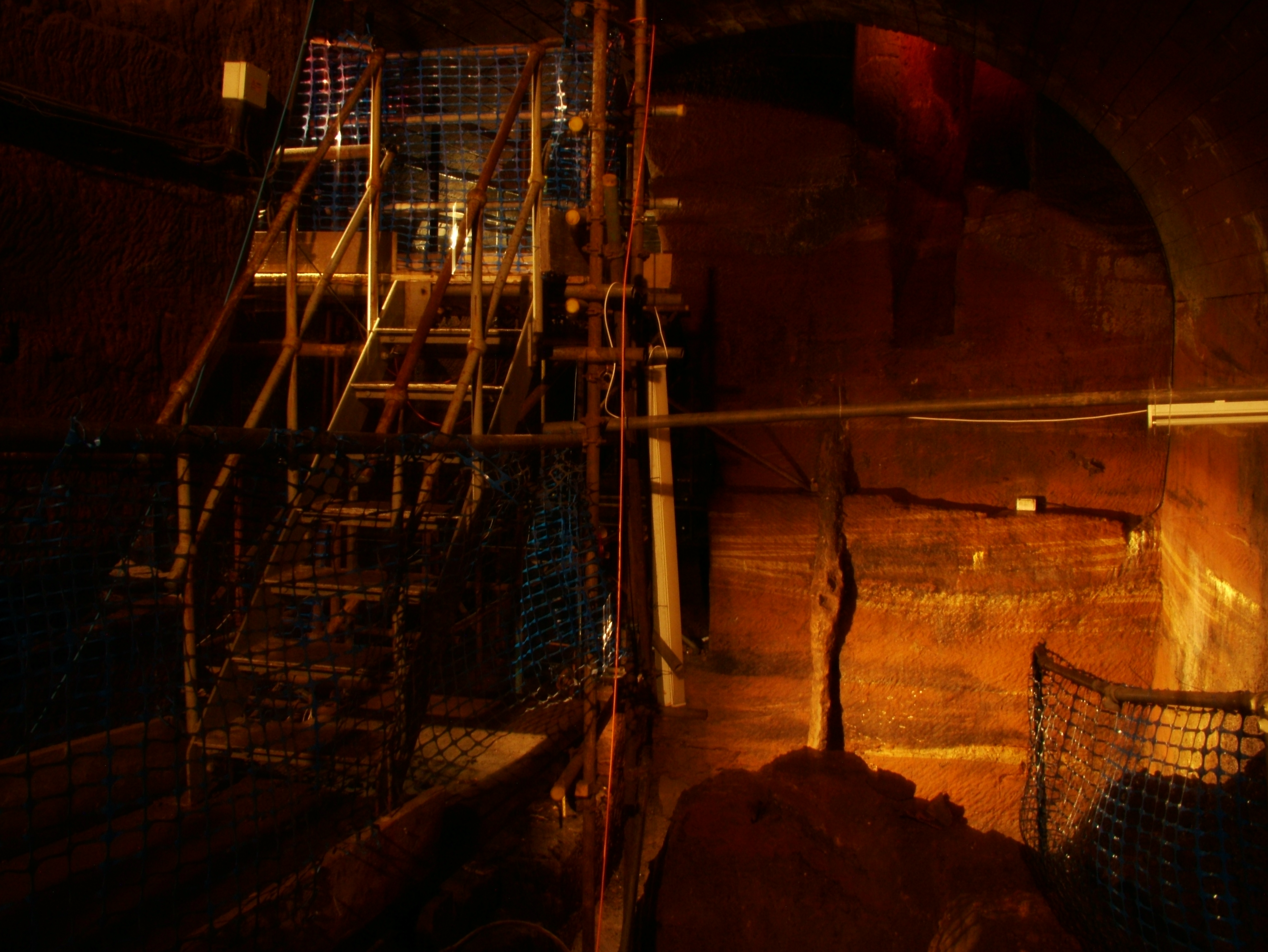
The corner tunnel and arch constructed out of individual sandstone blocks, with a view of Biddulph's factory rubbish chute.

Both societies eventually acquired the rights to begin digging, and over time a considerable portion of Williamson's legacy has been rediscovered and cleared of the last two centuries' accumulated spoil and rubble. In the course of excavation, a substantial number of artefacts have been found – some dating back as far as the 1830s – including bottles, plates and other crockery, pipes, vintage signs, military items and other items, much of which was probably refuse dumped in the tunnels. Many of these finds have been cleaned and put on display.

== Extent of the excavations ==
The known tunnels are in an area to the east of the Roman Catholic Liverpool Metropolitan Cathedral in a rectangle bordered by Mason Street, Grinfield Street, Smithdown Lane and Paddington. Their full extent is unknown and many are still blocked by rubble. They encompass a range of designs and sizes, from vast chambers to spaces inaccessible by an average human. The "Banqueting Hall" is around 60 feet (18 m) long and up to 27 feet (8.2 m) high, while the largest "Paddington" chamber is shorter but an impressive 40 feet (12 m) deep. Still larger excavations, such as the vaulted "Great Tunnel" seen by James Stonehouse and Charles Hand and noted on the Army surveys, have yet to be rediscovered.

== Purpose of the tunnels ==
The purpose of the excavations has been the subject of widespread speculation. According to Stonehouse's near-contemporary account, Williamson was secretive about his motives, leading to a great deal of speculative local folklore. Upon hearing that Stonehouse planned to publish his research on Williamson's excavations, Williamson's friend, the artist Cornelius Henderson, threatened to sue Stonehouse both for libel and trespass, leading to the paper's suppression for some years.

The most commonly related explanation is that they were a philanthropic endeavour. Williamson's own explanation was reputed to be that his motive was "the employment of the poor"; his workers "all received a weekly wage and were thus enabled to enjoy the blessing of charity without the attendant curse of stifled self respect". Certain features of the tunnels appear to support this theory; there are many architectural features that seem unnecessarily decorative, hidden deep below the ground in chambers that would likely have been dimly lit and rarely seen. By way of example, at the Mason Street site a beautifully-constructed stone arch was recently uncovered in an otherwise plainly-constructed side chamber, deep underground, with no obvious explanation for its purpose. These features could be interpreted as Williamson helping his employees improve their skills.

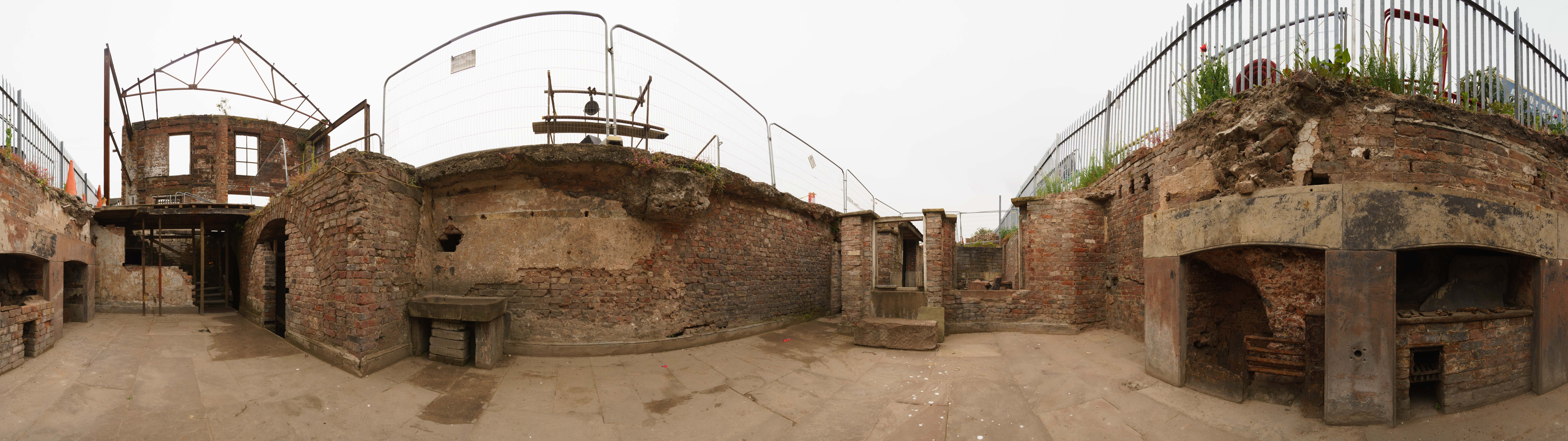
A panoramic view showing the remains of the Joseph Williamson's house, at basement level.

Another suggestion, that he was a member of an extremist religious sect fearing that the end of the world was near and that the tunnels were built to provide refuge for him and his friends, originated in recent times with a casual suggestion made on a television programme. No evidence has been found to support the existence of such a sect or that Williamson, a practising member of the Church of England, belonged to one.

Stonehouse and Hand both felt the excavations were simply the largely purposeless folly of an eccentric man. However, while Stonehouse called the works "stupendously useless", Hand concluded that Williamson's philanthropic purpose was a noble one and felt he "should have been both pleased and proud to have known him." Many of Williamson's workers were said to have later found employment in railway construction with the skills they had learned.

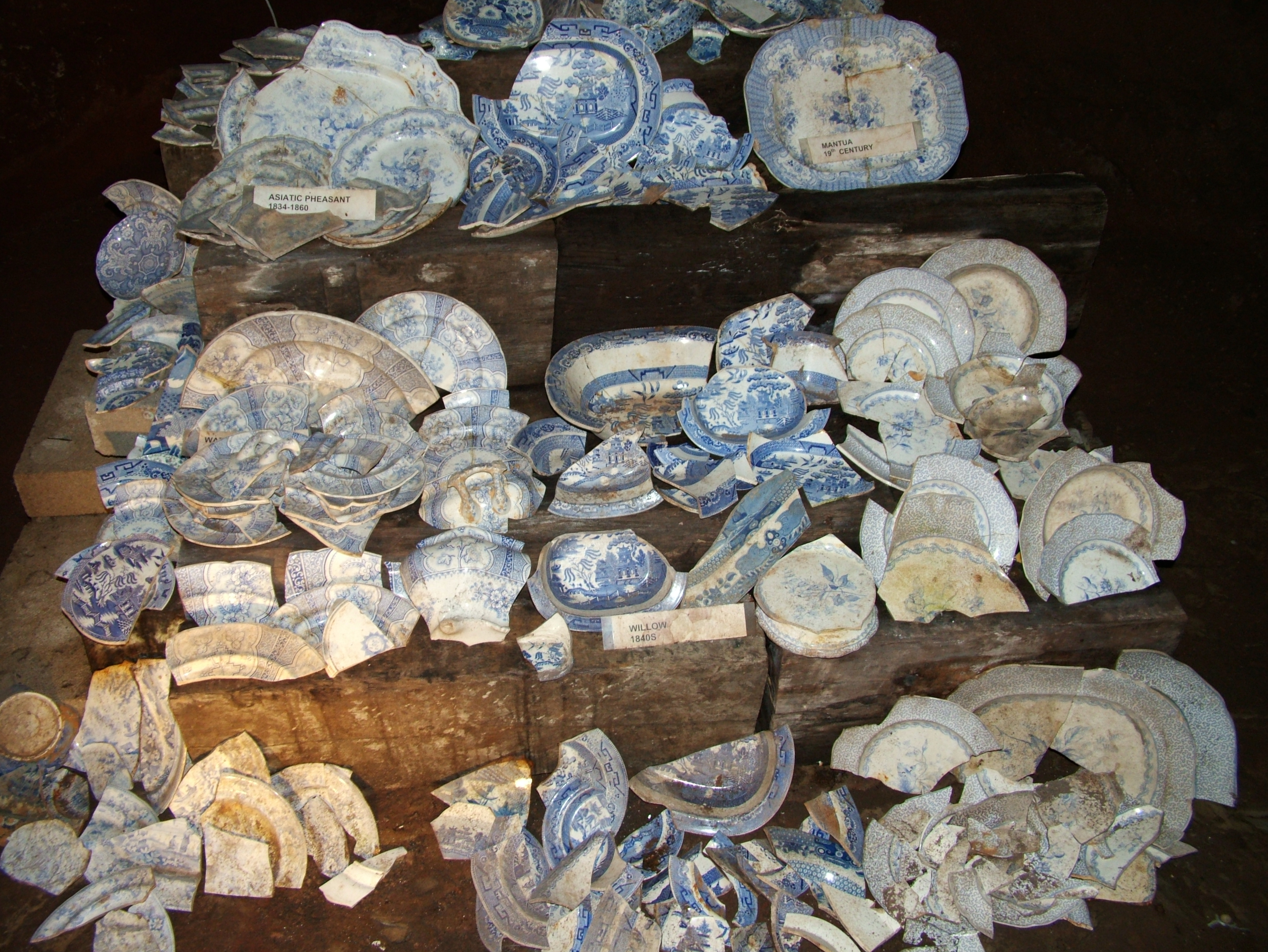
Scores of pieces of crockery, dating from the 1830s onwards, are among the artefacts found in the tunnels during clearance work.

More recent research by academics at Edge Hill University has concluded that the 'tunnels' were in fact the result of work by Williamson to restore ground levels after quarrying. Most of the excavations are directly within a band of high-quality sandstone and show clear signs of having been carried out using established quarrying techniques designed to produce single large pieces of stone suitable for building use. In addition, the cross-sections of the works produced by the 1881 survey reveal a typical stone quarry profile. The apparently aimless nature of the excavations was likely a reflection of the work following the best "seam" of stone, avoiding imperfections and master joints. The tunnels had, therefore, originally been unregulated "slot quarries" for sandstone, used for prestige buildings in the rapidly-expanding Liverpool of the Georgian era, and by subsequently vaulting them over Williamson was able to restore ground levels, facilitating his extensive housing developments on the site.

While during Williamson's lifetime it was locally rumoured that he was earning large sums from unlicensed quarrying, Williamson had apparently claimed that he made little money, using extracted sandstone largely within his own properties. It seems possible that his secrecy was at least partly driven by a need to conceal his avoidance of both large amounts of income tax and mineral rights duties due to the West Derby Waste Commission from the sale of sandstone. Knowledge of the latter dealings may have been the reason behind Henderson's threat to sue James Stonehouse. Despite retiring from the tobacco trade in 1818, Williamson left an estate valued at £40,000 – the equivalent of around £3.3 million in 2019 – and it appears that a large proportion of this income must have come from his excavations and subsequent property development.

== The Joseph Williamson Society and Heritage Centre ==
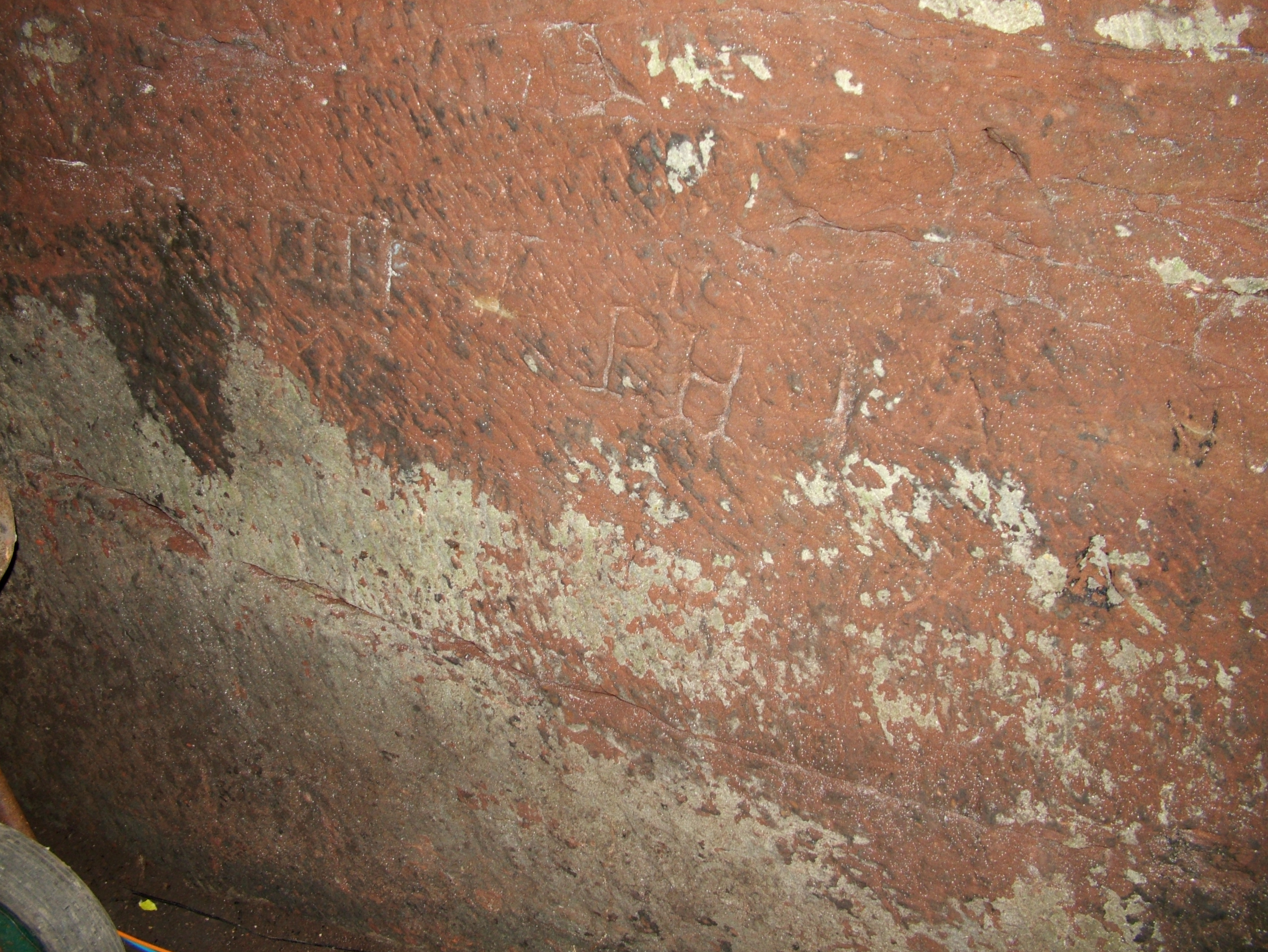
Graffiti, circa 1960s, on a wall of the Williamson Tunnels

The Joseph Williamson Society was founded in 1989. It was incorporated as a private limited company in 1996 and acquired charitable status in 1997. Its aim is to promote interest in the life and philanthropic achievements of Joseph Williamson and takes the form of talks, tours, publications and educational visits. In autumn 2002, after much excavation, removal of rubble and renovation, one of the three sections of the site, the Stable Yard section, was opened to the public as the Williamson Tunnels Heritage Centre (53°24′14″N 2°57′31″W) under the trusteeship of the Joseph Williamson Society.

Visitors are taken on a guided tour which includes the south tunnel and the double tunnel and various artefacts are on view including some of the items which have been uncovered in the excavations. A programme of events and entertainments is organised on the site. The entry to the heritage centre was formerly part of the Lord Mayor's Stable Yard which closed in 1993. The stable was again home for a horse for a while in the early 2000’s when Pop took residence in 2003.

=== Public access ===
The Heritage Centre allows visitors to see a substantial section of the tunnels, including the impressive "Double Tunnel". They are open Tuesday-Sunday during the summer months (Thursday-Sunday in Winter) with no advance booking required. The centre is also used as a unique venue for live music and events, as well as being available for use as location for filming and training.

== The Friends of Williamson's Tunnels (FoWT) ==
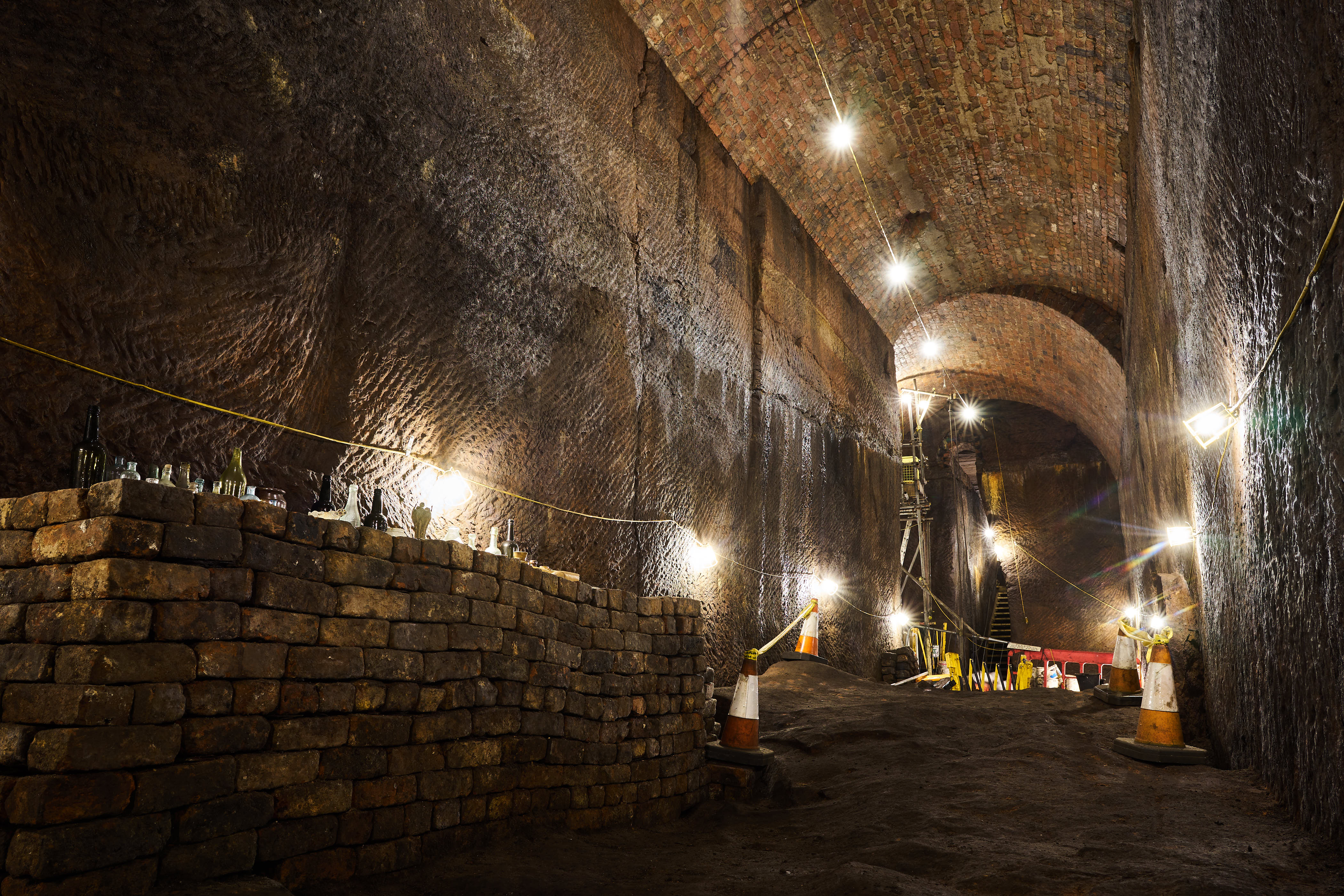
The 'banqueting hall' beneath Joseph Williamson's house. This section was most likely built as a stone quarry in the early 19th century and later vaulted over. The chamber was filled with spoil, and was excavated between 2017 and 2018.

The Friends of Williamson's Tunnels (FoWT) is a registered charity, managed by a board of trustees and committed to exploring, excavating and preserving the tunnels, with the work of excavation carried out by volunteers.

FoWT's main base on Mason Street is the site of Joseph Williamson's house, largely demolished except for a small section of the facade which remains standing. However, excavations there have uncovered an extensive portion of the site below ground level, as well as numerous tunnels branching off in various directions at different depths. Beneath the basement area is a large chamber known as the "Banqueting Hall", which gained its nickname from oft-repeated stories of Williamson holding lavish banquets for his most loyal friends, though it is highly unlikely the space was ever used for this purpose. As of 2019 the "Banqueting Hall" has been completely cleared of spoil, but excavations continue in newly discovered tunnels leading off from the main chamber.

A second section of tunnels is accessed from the "Paddington" site, comprising a series of underground galleries on several levels, leading to a large vaulted chamber approximately 40 feet (12 m) high from floor to ceiling. The floor of this chamber is approximately 60 feet (18 m) below ground level and was cleared in 2016 after several years of excavation.

The sites have been used as a filming location, and have appeared in several documentaries featuring the tunnels and FoWT volunteers. The group has been featured in several news items, including domestic TV channels like the BBC and ITV.

=== Public access ===
The general public can visit the "Paddington" site with free guided tours on Wednesdays and Sundays, while the Mason Street site can be accessed by FoWT members. Members can also go to regular historical talks and other events.

== In fiction ==
- In Series 13 of Doctor Who, entitled Doctor Who: Flux, the Williamson Tunnels, as well as Joseph Williamson and James Stonehouse, are featured. In the story, with digging set in the 1820s, Williamson seems to be aware of "the cataclysmic, the impossible" lying ahead, which in 2021 prove to be the unknown force the Flux, tearing through the universe, reducing everything it touches to nothing. Williamson appears several times throughout the series, appearing in locations and time periods he couldn't have naturally reached; the penultimate episode reveals that the tunnels somehow contain portals across time and space, which Williamson has been exploring in an attempt to find a way to stop the Flux. The portals are used by the Thirteenth Doctor and her allies to move through time and space as well as a hiding place for the resistance against the Sontaran invasion. After both the Flux and the Sontarans are defeated, one of the portals is used to exile a deposed dictator called the Grand Serpent to a small asteroid.
- Joseph Williamson's life and the building of the Williamson tunnels have been dramatised by Liverpool-based playwright and screenwriter Karen Brown in her stage and radio play The King of Edge Hill. An examination of the point at which philanthropy turns to obsession, the radio version of the play was broadcast on Radio 4 on March 21, 2000 to considerable acclaim. The stage version played at Liverpool's Unity Theatre in 2007, and won the HSBC award for New Playwriting Talent’ and ‘The Echo Arts award for best New Play.
