= Barbara Choe Yong-i =

Korean Roman Catholic martyr (1819–1840)

Saint Barbara Choe Yong-i
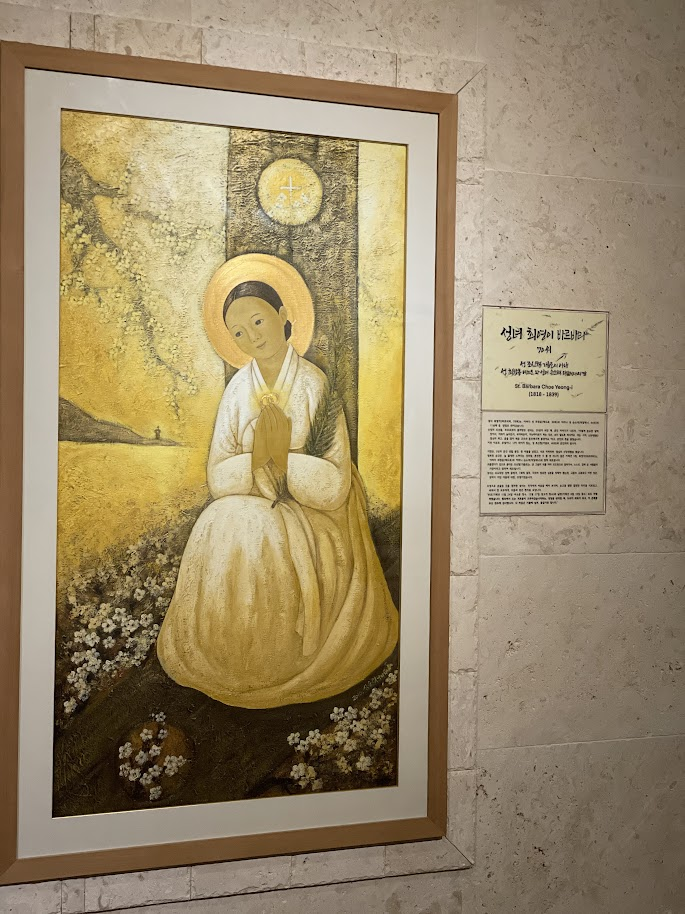
- Born: 최영이 바르바라; 1819; Seoul, Korea
- Died: 1 February 1840; Seoul, Korea
- Cause of death: beheading
- Honored in: Catholicism
- Beatified: 5 July 1925 by Pope Pius XI
- Canonized: 6 May 1984 by Pope John Paul II

Saint Barbara Choe Yong-i (Korean: 최영이 바르바라, 1819 – February 1, 1840), also known as Bareubara Choe Yeong-i, was a Korean Roman Catholic laywoman, martyr and saint. She is one of the 103 Korean martyrs.

== Biography ==
Saint Barbara Choe Yon-gi was born in Seoul, Korea. Her parents were Peter Ch'oe Ch'ang-hŭb and Magdalene Son. Choe was a devout Catholic and demanded that whoever she married be a fervent Catholic when her parents came to arrange her marriage. She married Carlos Cho, who was 44, when she was 20, and they had one son.

In 1840, Choe was captured and brought to court to renounce her Christian beliefs, but refused even when tortured. She was sentenced to death by beheading and was executed on 1 February 1840 in Dangkogae, Seoul, Korea.

Choe was recognized as a martyr and beatified by Pope Pius XI on 5 July 1925. She was canonised by Pope John Paul II on 6 May 1984, as one of the 103 Korean martyrs.

Her feast day is on 1 September.
