= Joseph Williamson (philanthropist) =

English businessman, property owner and philanthropist

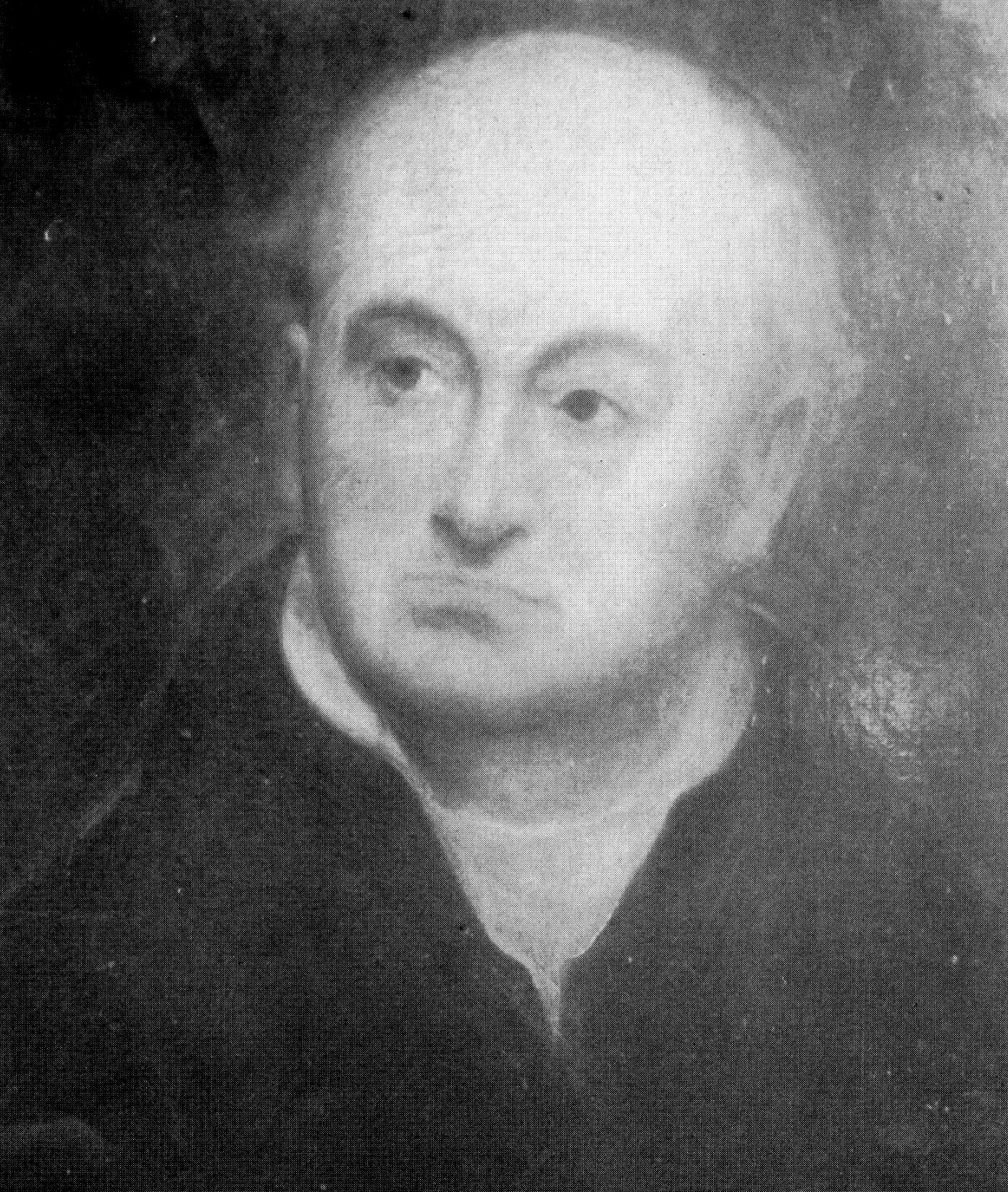
- Born: 10 March 1769; Barnsley, West Riding of Yorkshire, England
- Died: 1 May 1840 (aged 71); Liverpool, Lancashire, England
- Resting place: St Thomas' Church, Liverpool
- Occupation: Merchant
- Known for: Philanthropy, tunnel-building
- Spouse: Elizabeth Tate

Joseph Williamson (10 March 1769 – 1 May 1840) was an eccentric English businessman, philanthropist and property owner who is best known for the Williamson Tunnels, which were constructed under his direction in the Edge Hill area of Liverpool, England. His philanthropy earned him the nickname the King of Edge Hill, whilst his tunnel-building activity earned him posthumous nicknames, including the Mole of Edge Hill and the Mad Mole.

== Biography ==
For many years it was thought that Joseph Williamson was born in Warrington, Lancashire. However, research by staff and volunteers of the Williamson Tunnels Heritage Centre has shown that he was born in the West Riding of Yorkshire and that his father was a glassmaker in a small village near Barnsley. At an early age, his family moved to Warrington. In 1780, when he was aged 11, he left his family and went to Liverpool where he was employed in the tobacco and snuff business of Richard Tate. He gained promotion within the business and also developed his own merchant's business in partnership with Joseph Leigh. In 1787 Richard Tate died and control of the business passed to his son, Thomas Moss Tate. Williamson married Thomas' sister, Elizabeth, in St Thomas' Church, Liverpool in 1802. The following year Williamson purchased the business from Thomas Moss Tate and from this, together with his other business enterprises, he amassed a considerable fortune.

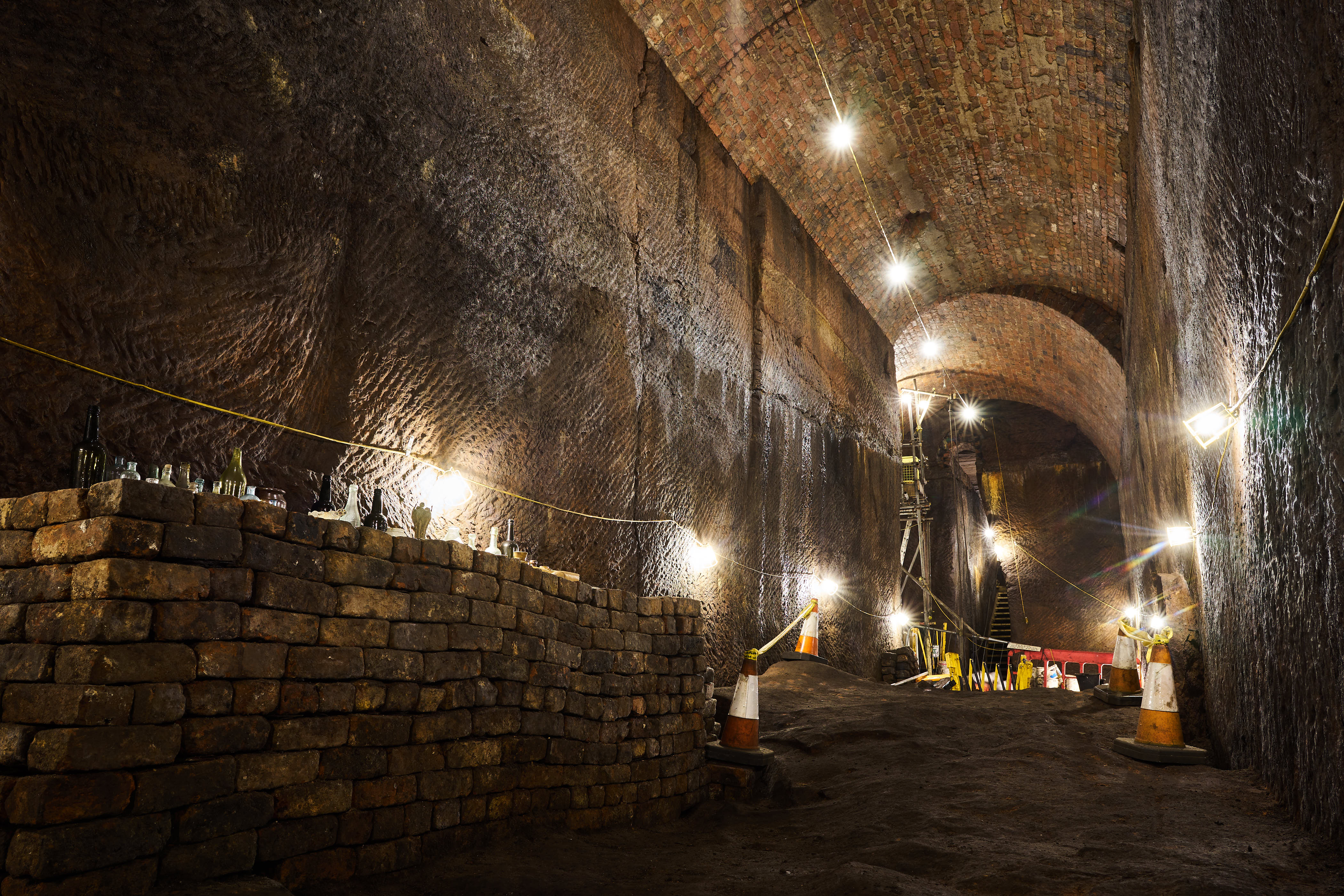
The 'banqueting hall' beneath Joseph Williamson's house. This section was most likely built as a stone quarry in the 18th century and later vaulted over. The chamber was filled with spoil in Victorian times, and was excavated between 2017 and 2018.

In 1805 Williamson bought an area known as the Long Broom Field on Mason Street, Edge Hill, Liverpool, which was a largely undeveloped outcrop of sandstone and around this time moved into a house on Mason Street. He then began to build more houses in Mason Street which were built without any plans and which were "of the strangest description". The land behind the houses dropped sharply for about 20 feet (6 m) and, as it was the fashion to have large gardens and orchards behind them, he built brick arches onto which the gardens could be extended. Following this, he continued to employ his workmen, and recruited more, to perform tasks, some of which appeared to be useless, such as moving materials from one place to another and then back again. He also used the men to build a labyrinth of underground halls and brick-arched tunnels. Labour was plentiful at the time and with the ending of the Napoleonic Wars in 1816, there were even more unemployed men in Liverpool. The tunnels were built at depths between 10 feet (3 m) and 50 feet (15 m) and they stretched for several miles.

Williamson retired from his business in 1818 but continued to be a landlord, one of his tenants being the Unitarian philosopher, James Martineau. His wife died in 1822 and he then became increasingly eccentric, devoting almost all of his time to supervising his excavations and tunnel-building. In the 1830s he came into contact with George Stephenson who was building the extension of the Liverpool and Manchester Railway from Edge Hill to Lime Street stations and whose own excavations passed through those of Williamson. Williamson died in 1840 aged 71 at his home in Mason Street, the cause of death being "water on the chest" (an archaic phrase later known as dropsy). He was buried in the Tate family vault at St Thomas' Church and left an estate of £39,000. He left no immediate descendant. The tunnelling ceased with his death. In 1911 St Thomas' Church was demolished. Many of the graves were removed but the Tate vault remained. In 1920 the site became a car park. During the Paradise Street development in 2005 the grave was discovered in an archaeological dig. The developers of the site, Grosvenor Henderson, have built a memorial garden to Williamson now that development has been completed.

== Personality ==
There is much evidence of Williamson's eccentricity in addition to his tunnel-building activity. His own house and the other houses built under his direction were unorthodox and often impractical in design. On the day of his wedding, following the ceremony he went hunting, still dressed in his wedding clothes. On one occasion he invited guests for dinner but served them only a simple meal of porridge and hard biscuits. Many of the visitors then left. He described those who remained as his real friends and invited them to stay for a more lavish feast. Relationships with his wife were not always amicable and he said himself that they led a "cat and dog" life. On one occasion Williamson set free all the birds in his wife's aviary, declaring that it was a pity that men did not also have wings to enable them to enjoy liberty. His manner varied from being "rough and uncouth" to "kind and considerate". His clothes were patched and untidy but his underclothes were clean and fine. He was a religious man and held a pew at St Thomas' Church.

== In popular culture ==
In the 13th series of Doctor Who (2021), Steve Oram plays Williamson in a recurring role. Williamson's tunnels provide the key which helps the Thirteenth Doctor (Jodie Whittaker) save Earth from trans-dimensional invaders.
