= Anes =

Anes or ANES may refer to:

- Anes, alternative name of Samartindianes, a parish in the municipality of Siero, in northern Spain
- American National Election Studies
- Añes, hamlet and concejo in the municipality of Ayala/Aiara, Álava, Basque Country, Spain
- Äneş, alternative name for the river Anish

== People ==
Given name

- Anes Čardaklija (born 2005), Swedish footballer
- Anes Haurdić (born 1990), Bosnian-Herzegovinian footballer
- Anes Omerovic (born 1998), Austrian footballer
- Anes Rušević (born 1996), Serbian footballer
- Anes Saad (born 1996), Algerian footballer
- Anes Zverotić (born 1985), Montenegrin footballer

Surname

- Brites Anes (born c. 1460), mistress of King John II of Portugal
- Concepcion Anes (1929/30–2004), Gibraltarian politician
- Curt Anes (born 1980), American football player
- Gonzalo Anes (1931–2014), Spanish economist, professor and historian
- João Anes (died 1402), first archbishop of Lisbon.

== See also ==
- Ane (disambiguation)
- Anees, masculine given name of Arabic origin
