= AEV =

AEV may refer to:

- Aboitiz Equity Ventures, a holding company which controls the Aboitiz Group conglomerate, created by Jon Ramon Aboitiz
- Alternative energy vehicle, a type of automobile
- American Expedition Vehicles, a manufacturer of off-road and overland vehicle and parts
- Armored engineering vehicle, or military engineering vehicle
- Atlanta Esports Ventures, an American venture capital firm
- Autonomous and electric vehicle, electric self-driving vehicles

== See also ==
- AE (disambiguation)
- EV (disambiguation)
