= Jeep Gladiator (JT) =

American mid-size pickup truck

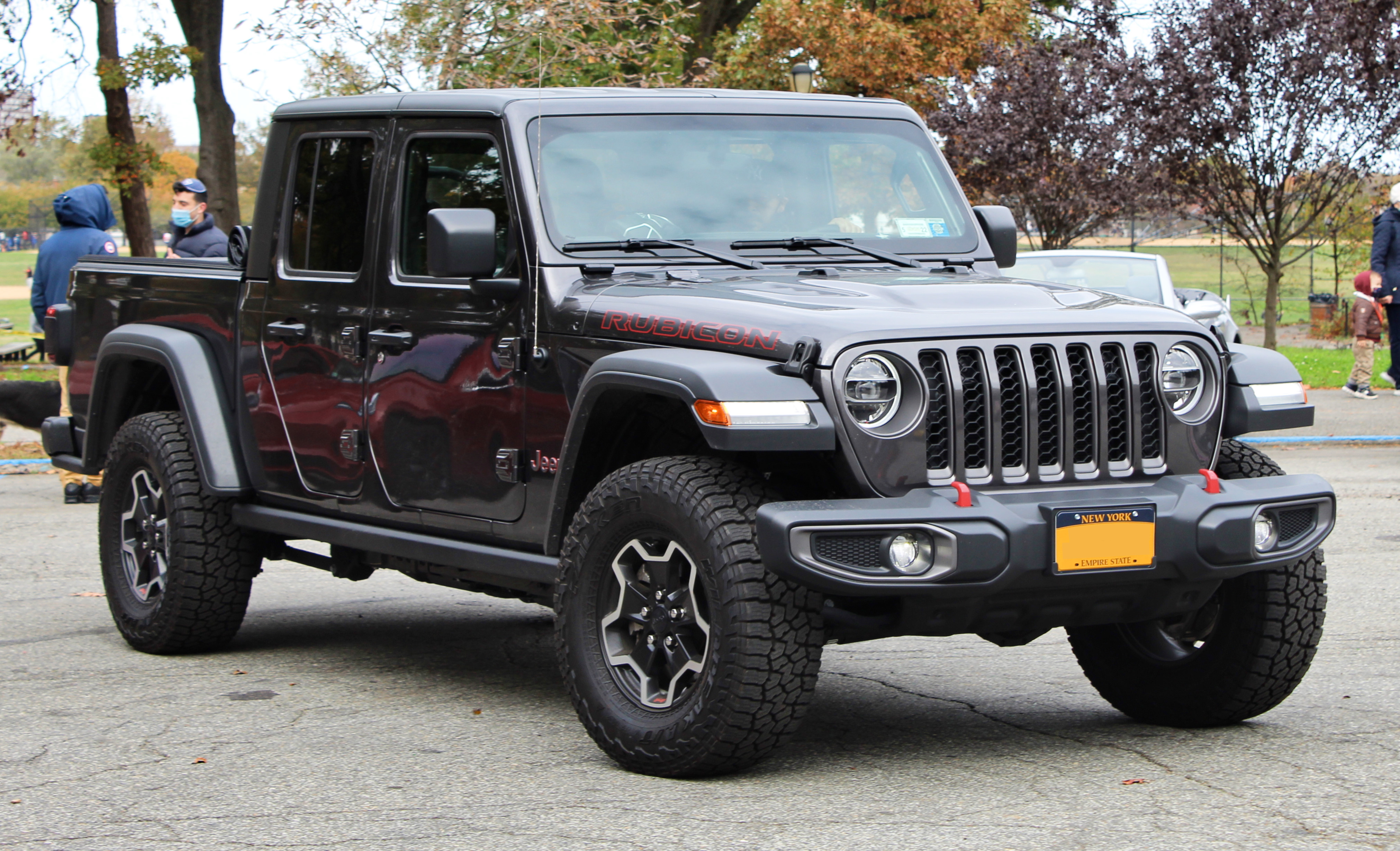

Overview
- Manufacturer: Jeep (Note: FCA US LLC (2019–2021); Stellantis North America (2021–present))
- Also called: Jeep JT (Mexico)
- Production: April 2019–present
- Model years: 2020–present
- Assembly: United States: Toledo, Ohio (Toledo Complex)
- Designer: Taylor Langhals

Body and chassis
- Class: Mid-size pickup truck
- Body style: 4-door pickup truck with removable roof and doors
- Layout: Front-engine, four-wheel-drive
- Related: Jeep Wrangler (JL)

Powertrain
- Engine: 3.6 L Pentastar V6 (gasoline); 3.0 L EcoDiesel V6 turbo (diesel)
- Transmission: 6-speed Aisin AL6 (D478) manual 8-speed ZF 8HP automatic

Dimensions
- Wheelbase: 137.3 in (3,487 mm)
- Length: 218.0 in (5,537 mm)
- Width: 73.8 in (1,875 mm)
- Height: 73.1–76.1 in (1,857–1,933 mm)
- Curb weight: 4,650–5,072 lb (2,109–2,301 kg)

Chronology
- Predecessor: Jeep CJ-10; Jeep Comanche

The Jeep Gladiator is a mid-size pickup truck manufactured by the Jeep division of Stellantis North America (formerly FCA US). It was introduced at the 2018 Los Angeles Auto Show on November 28, 2018, and went on sale in the spring of 2019 as a 2020 model. Based on the same platform as the Wrangler JL, the Gladiator is Jeep's first pickup truck since the Comanche was discontinued in 1992, although the very similar dual-cab AEV Brute was custom-made using the Wrangler platform from 2013 until 2017 by American Expedition Vehicles under license.

The first markets outside the Americas were Australia and New Zealand. It is now also marketed in China, Japan, South Korea, South Africa as well as in selected nations in South America, Europe, and Southeast Asia.

== History ==
The vehicle's name harkens back to the original Jeep Gladiator, made from 1962 until 1988 and known as the J-Series after 1971. Jeep considered reviving the Gladiator name alongside Comanche and, most commonly, Scrambler, as well as simply using a new name, before deciding on Gladiator, feeling it fits the truck the best.

A two-door version of a Jeep Scrambler pickup based on a lengthened Wrangler was shown in 2003 at the National Automobile Dealers Association meeting.

In late 2004, the Jeep Gladiator concept was introduced. The 2005 Gladiator Concept did not feature a removable roof, but had removable doors and a pickup bed. It also previewed the design of the upcoming Jeep Wrangler (JK). The Gladiator concept was powered by a 3.0 L Common-Rail Diesel (CRD) engine produced by VM Motori (similar to the one used in some models of the Jeep Grand Cherokee), mated to a manual transmission, and four-wheel-drive. It featured functional rear mini-doors and rear passenger seating. The Gladiator concept featured a green-on-gray color scheme for both the exterior and interior.

== Exterior design ==
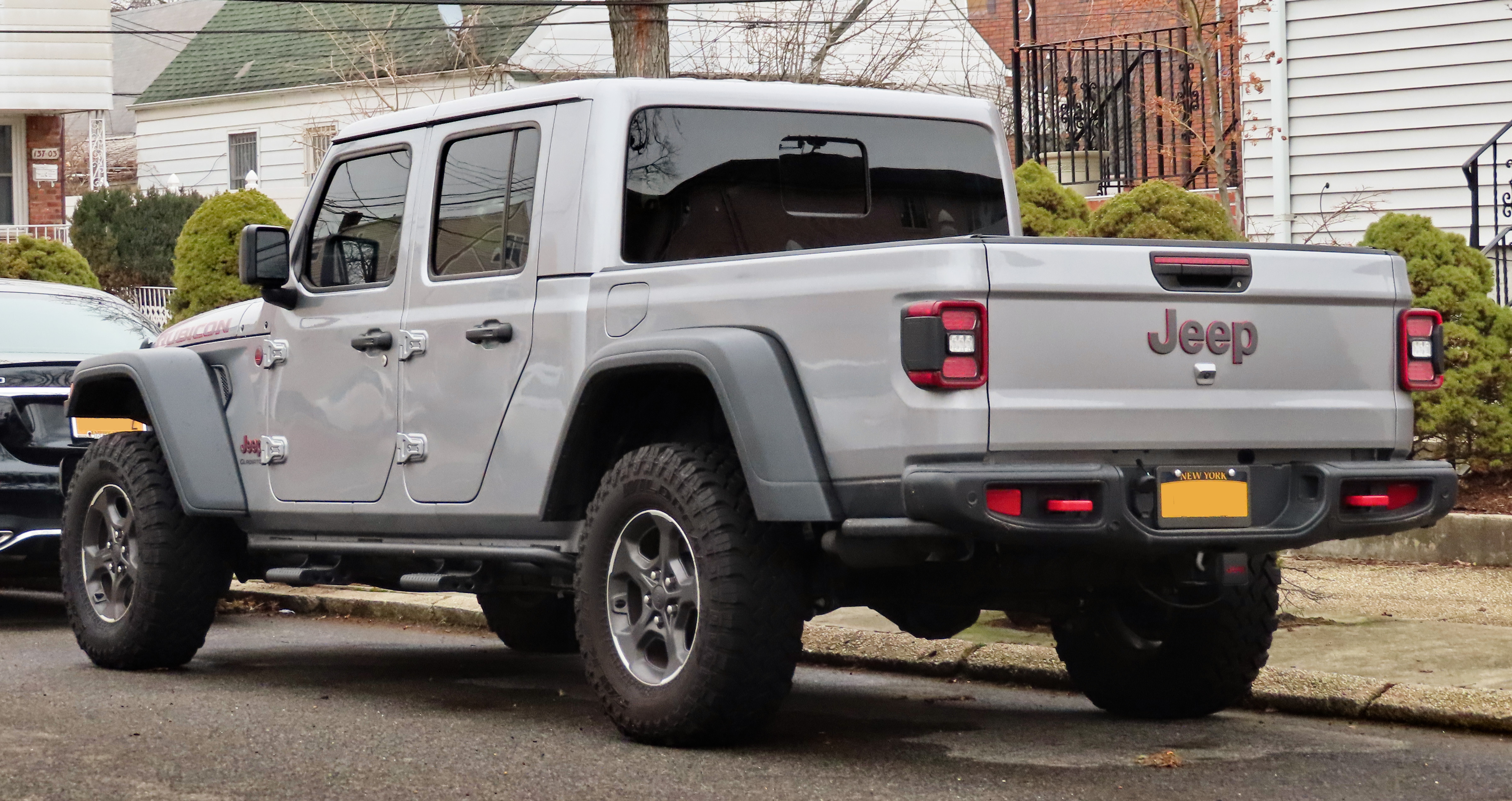
Jeep Gladiator (JT) rear

The four-door, five-passenger mid-size Gladiator features exterior and interior styling cues from the Jeep Wrangler (JL). Taylor Langhals was the lead exterior designer on Gladiator. Because a truck is frequently used for both hauling and towing, the front grille slots were enlarged to allow for increased airflow and heavier-duty engine cooling. A full-sized spare tire, normally mounted on the Wrangler's rear tailgate, is mounted underneath the cargo bed of the Gladiator.

Four different roof options are available, similar to those on the Wrangler JL, including a black vinyl Sun-Rider soft top and a premium black fabric Sun-Rider soft top (both of which can be fully retracted), a black Freedom-Top three-piece hard top, and a color-keyed Freedom-Top three-piece hard top, both of which have removable roof panels over the front row of seating.

The truck has front and rear doors that can be fully removed, as well as a windshield that can be lowered (like the Wrangler JL). Jeep includes a tool kit with the tools necessary to remove the doors and lower the windshield. The Gladiator is unique in that it is the only truck available with a convertible folding soft top.

A front-facing trail cam, mounted in one of the front grille slots, is also available that displays an image on the touchscreen of what is directly in front of the vehicle (this feature requires one of the two larger U Connect touchscreen displays), and will assist in off-road maneuverability, such as water fording, as well as climbing over objects like logs and rocks. The "Off Road Pages" application, displayed in the instrument cluster, allows a Gladiator driver to view approach and departure angles, steering angles, and more.

== Powertrain ==
At launch, the sole engine on the Jeep Gladiator was the 3.6 L Pentastar gasoline V6 engine with Variable Valve Timing, producing 285 hp (213 kW; 289 PS) and 260 lb⋅ft (353 N⋅m) of torque.

However, for three years starting with the 2021 model year, the 3.0 L EcoDiesel Turbocharged diesel V6 engine was available as an option, producing 260 hp (194 kW; 264 PS) and 442 lb⋅ft (599 N⋅m) of torque. The EcoDiesel engine was available on all trim levels of the Gladiator except the Mojave trim.

Gasoline-powered Gladiators offer the option of either the six-speed manual Aisin AL6 (D478), or the Chrysler-manufactured version of the ZF 8HP transmission automatic transmission.Diesel-powered Gladiators offer only the 8HP75 automatic version of the ZF 8HP transmission.

All powertrain options are derived from the Jeep Wrangler (JL); however, unlike the Wrangler JL, the Gladiator does not offer the turbocharged four-cylinder gasoline engine as an option. The V6 diesel engine was withdrawn after 2023 with the last diesel models designated FarOut editions.

Like the Jeep Wrangler (JL) on which it shares a platform, all Gladiator models come standard with four wheel drive. There are four systems available: the Command-Trac part-time system, available on all models except for the off-road-oriented Rubicon, the Selec-Trac full-time system, also available on all models except for the Rubicon, and two versions of the Rock-Trac system on the Rubicon (both with 4.10 gear ratios): either a standard part-time version or an optional full-time version.

For the 2025 model year, Jeep announced that it will be bringing its 4Xe hybrid powertrain to the Gladiator as well. It was expected to use the same 2.0L turbo 4-cylinder setup from the Wrangler and Grand Cherokee 4Xe. On September 22, 2025, Stellantis cancelled its plans to release the 4Xe in a larger model realignment.

For the 2025 model year, the manual transmission has been discontinued.

== Trim levels ==
The Gladiator is available in Sport, Sport S, Overland (until 2023), Willys Sport (2021–2023), Willys (from 2021), limited edition Freedom (2021–2023), Mojave, and Rubicon trim levels. For 2020, and again in 2023, a limited edition High Altitude trim level was offered, as the most expensive Gladiator model. From 2024, there are new top-of-the-line Mojave X and Rubicon X models.

Upon its launch in 2020, a limited-edition Rubicon Launch Edition model was offered, limited to 4,190 units.

The Gladiator and equivalent Wrangler JL diverge when it comes to their luxury trim levels. The luxury Wrangler is named "Sahara", while the luxury trim Gladiator was the "Overland" model. When equipped with leather upholstery, the Overland received a stitched soft-touch dashboard surface and a hand-stitched dashboard, similar to that of the Wrangler Sahara.

In Australia and New Zealand, trim levels were Sport S, Overland and Rubicon for 2020-2021 models. From 2022, trim levels were reduced to Night Eagle and Rubicon to bring the range in line with the Compass, Wrangler, and Grand Cherokee portfolios in terms of variant names for that market. Features-wise, the Night Eagle trim level is similar to the equivalent Willys Sport trim level in the United States. As with European models, Australian models came with the higher-spec LED taillights to allow for amber turn signals. All models are sold with only the petrol 3.6 L V6 and 8-speed automatic transmission.

For the Middle Eastern market, the Sport, Overland, and Rubicon models were sold in United Arab Emirates, and member states of the Gulf Cooperation Council. The U.S. Mojave model was introduced in 2021 and renamed Sandrunner for the Middle East. Available models are Sport and Sandrunner only.

In South Africa, Japan, and South Korea only the Rubicon trim level is available. The Gladiator was first introduced in Europe in 2021 in Sport-S and Overland trim only and with the 3.0L diesel V6 as the only engine option. The Gladiator was withdrawn from the European market at the end of 2023 with the last models in FarOut trim, signifying the last use of the 3.0L diesel V6 engine.

== Payload and towing capacities ==
Payload capacity varies by trim. The minimum is 1,000 lb (450 kg) and the maximum payload is 1,700 lb (770 kg) for the Sport S with 3.6 L V6 engine, 6-speed manual transmission.

The bed of the truck can be optionally equipped with a rear folding tonneau cover, which features a "Weekend Warrior Mode" that allows for the tailgate to be closed and 2x4-inch lumber to be hauled in the pickup bed. Only one section of the tonneau cover can be open, and the cover can also be fully retracted or removed if required. The tailgate is hinged and can be locked in a partially-open position if the tailgate does not need to be fully down.

Towing capacity also varies. The standard Gladiator features a towing capacity of 4,000 lb (1,800 kg). A heavy-duty towing package is available on select Gladiator Sport models, increasing the towing capacity to 7,650 lb (3,470 kg) and includes a 4.10 rear axle ratio. Rubicon models with automatic transmissions tow 7,000lb.

The diesel-powered Gladiator will feature a lower towing capacity rating than the gasoline-powered variant.

== Off-roading ==
The Gladiator features an approach angle of 43.6 degrees, a breakover angle of 20.3 degrees, and a departure angle of 26 degrees. The Rubicon comes with front- and rear-axle electric lockers and an electronically disconnecting front sway bar.

A front camera system is available on the Gladiator that allows the driver to see obstacles in front and to the sides of the vehicle while off-road. Information to help with monitoring the vehicle during off-roading can be found in the Off-road Pages, which are contained in the Apps section of the Uconnect infotainment system.

== Interior ==
Unique features on the Gladiator include a flat rear load floor for carrying longer and taller items inside the truck's interior. As part of the "Lifestyle Adventure Package", there is secure and lockable storage underneath the rear bench seat, and a removable Bluetooth wireless speaker that charges when the vehicle is running, and the speaker is in its docking station located behind the rear bench seat.

From the front seats forward, the Gladiator features an interior design that is nearly identical to that of the Jeep Wrangler JL. The Gladiator has the same dash layout and the same positioning of the gear selector, 4WD mode selector, and manual parking brake. The only difference is that the gear selector, if in a vehicle with an automatic gearbox, has a depiction of the Gladiator, instead of a Willys Jeep like the one found on the Wrangler automatic gearbox selector.

Like the Wrangler JL, three different touchscreen infotainment systems are available on the Gladiator, each integrating the rearview camera into the touchscreen:

- Up until 2021, Sport, Willys Sport, Sport S, and Willys models featured the U Connect 3 5.0BT radio. The radio includes an A/M-F/M stereo tuner, along with Bluetooth hands-free calling and stereo audio streaming capabilities, a microSD card slot, and an auxiliary audio input jack. SiriusXM Satellite Radio is also available as an option. This radio option was discontinued from the Gladiator following the 2021 model year.
- Up until 2021, Freedom, Overland, Mojave, and Rubicon models featured the U Connect 4 7.0 infotainment system. The system includes all of the features of the base-model U Connect 3 5.0BT radio, plus Apple CarPlay and Android Auto smartphone integration, and the deletion of the microSD card slot. SiriusXM Satellite Radio is available as an option. The U Connect 4 7.0 system was available as an option on the 2020 and 2021 Sport S and Willys models. Starting with the 2022 model year, Sport, Willys Sport, Sport S, and Willys models gained the U Connect 4 7.0 system as standard equipment, as the U Connect 3 5.0BT radio was discontinued.
- Up until 2021, all models except the base Sport and Sport Willys offered the U Connect 4C 8.4 infotainment system with GPS navigation. The system includes all of the features of the mid-level U Connect 4 7.0 system, plus HD Radio, SiriusXM Satellite Radio (including a one-year trial subscription), SiriusXM Travel Link Services (including a five-year trial subscription), U Connect Guardian Services powered by SiriusXM (including a one-year trial subscription), a 4G LTE wireless modem, and Garmin-based GPS navigation. This system was also standard on the 2021 80th Anniversary Edition and High Altitude models.
- Starting with the 2022 model year, Overland, Mojave, and Rubicon models (and Night Eagle models in Australia and New Zealand) gained the U Connect 4 8.4 system with GPS navigation as standard equipment. The system is also available on all Gladiator models except for the base Sport and Willys Sport models when equipped with the optional "8.4 Radio and Premium Audio Group."

The standard audio system in all models of the Gladiator except for the 80th Anniversary Edition and High Altitude models is an eight-speaker system featuring four four-inch speakers and four 3.5-inch speakers. Optional on all models except for the base Sport and Willys Sport models, and standard on the 80th Anniversary Edition and Altitude models, is the Alpine premium audio system featuring an amplifier, a dashboard-mounted 3.5-inch center-channel speaker, and a subwoofer mounted under the rear split-bench seat. The system is automatically included when the U Connect 4C 8.4 infotainment system with GPS navigation is ordered, or when the 8.4 Radio and Premium Audio Group is selected. For the 2022 model year, the Overland, Mojave, and Rubicon models gained the Alpine premium audio system as standard equipment. In addition, all models equipped with the Alpine system also have the option of a portable wireless Bluetooth speaker that recharges behind the split-bench seat, which is an option not offered on the related Jeep Wrangler (JL).

== Safety ==
The Gladiator has most of the safety features that are also in the Wrangler JL, including forward-collision warning with active braking and adaptive cruise control. The Jeep Active Safety Group and Jeep Advanced Active Safety Group are both available on all models except for the base Sport, and are included on the Rubicon Launch Edition.

Safety ratings from the National Highway Traffic Safety Administration (NHTSA) indicate that for the 2020 model of the Gladiator, the Front Driver's Side received 4 / 5 stars, and the Front Passenger Side received 5 / 5 stars. The technical crash test report for those ratings was prepared by Calspan Corporation and was released on December 10, 2019.

The 2022 Gladiator was safety rated by the IIHS:

IIHS Gladiator scores (2022):
Small overlap front (Driver)	Marginal	
Moderate overlap front	Good	
Moderate overlap front (updated test)	Poor	
Roof strength	Good	
Headlights	Marginal / Poor	varies by trim/option
Front crash prevention (Vehicle-to-Vehicle)	Superior	optional
Front crash prevention (Vehicle-to-Pedestrian)	Not Available	
Seat belt reminders	Marginal	
Child seat anchors (LATCH) ease of use	Acceptable	

ANCAP test results Jeep Gladiator all variants (2019, aligned with Euro NCAP)
Test	Points	%
Overall:	5 /5 stars	
Adult occupant:	23	60%
Child occupant:	39.3	80%
Pedestrian:	23.8	49%
Safety assist:	6.6	51%

== Marketing ==
The introduction video at the Los Angeles Auto Show used a sound clip from the 2000 film Gladiator, showing the original Jeep Gladiator telling the new model that it "needed to win the crowd", just before the formal introduction of the new model. During Super Bowl LIV, Jeep premiered a commercial for the Gladiator starring Bill Murray, reprising his starring role from the film Groundhog Day (the game itself also fell on Groundhog Day). It was named the best commercial of Super Bowl LIV on USA Today's Super Bowl Ad Meter survey.

== Special editions ==
=== Rubicon Launch Edition ===
Jeep celebrated the launch of the Gladiator with the limited-edition Rubicon Launch Edition model. Available by preorder through a special website, and only on April 4, 2019 (Jeep 4X4 Day), the Rubicon Launch Edition is based on the top-of-the-line Rubicon trim level and includes all available options on that trim level with no additional options available. Available for an MSRP of $62,310, only 4,190 limited-edition Rubicon Launch Edition Gladiators were produced (the number "4,190" pays homage to the 419 area code of Toledo, Ohio, the home of Toledo Complex where the Gladiator is assembled). Special features that distinguish the Rubicon Launch Edition from other Gladiator models include special badging, special wheels, and a leather-wrapped instrument panel with red stitching. The Launch Edition was available in five colors: Black, Bright White, Firecracker Red, Granite Crystal Metallic, and Billet Silver Metallic.

=== North Edition ===
In late 2019, Jeep introduced the Gladiator North Edition. Based on the luxury-oriented Overland model, the North Edition is marketed toward Gladiator buyers living in colder climates. In addition to the standard equipment offered on the Overland, the Gladiator North Edition model adds features such as the U Connect 4C 8.4 touchscreen infotainment system with SiriusXM Guardian, satellite radio, and Travel Link services and Apple CarPlay and Android Auto smartphone integration, the nine-speaker Alpine premium amplified audio system with subwoofer, the Cold Weather Group (which includes dual heated front bucket seats, a heated leather-wrapped steering wheel, and a remote vehicle starter system), a unique "North" emblem on the rear tailgate, and rubberized all-weather front and rear floor mats. The North Edition is the first special-edition Gladiator trim level to be released, and will be followed by the Gladiator Mojave model.

=== Mojave ===
At the 2020 Chicago Auto Show, Jeep introduced the Gladiator Mojave. The Mojave is the first "Desert-Rated" Jeep model. Features on the Mojave trim include 33-inch Falken Wildpeak all-terrain tires (mud-terrain tires are also available as an option), unique seventeen-inch painted aluminum-alloy wheels, FOX brand 2.5-inch internal bypass shocks with external reservoirs, a unique "Desert Rated 4X4" emblem in place of the "Trail Rated 4X4" emblem on both front fenders, unique "Mojave" decals on both sides of the hood, orange tow hooks, an "Off Road Plus" button on the center console for increased off-road capabilities, and the ability to lock the Gladiator's rear axles at high speeds when in 4WD High mode (a feature exclusive to the Mojave). The interior, when equipped with the optional leather-trimmed seats, features special heat-reflective seating material that is engineered to withstand the hottest climates (all interiors on the Mojave feature unique orange stitching on the seats, steering wheel, dashboard, and door trim panels).

=== High Altitude Edition ===
At the 2020 Chicago Auto Show, Jeep introduced the Gladiator High Altitude Edition as the new "up-level" Gladiator trim level. The High Altitude Edition features a unique emblem on the rear tailgate, and also features twenty-inch all-season tires and black-painted aluminum-alloy wheels, color-keyed front and rear fender flares, color-keyed front and rear door handles and side mirrors, color-keyed front and rear bumpers, LED front and rear lighting, a color-keyed three-piece hardtop roof, a standard 8.4-inch U Connect 4C touchscreen infotainment system with SiriusXM Guardian, satellite radio, and Travel Link services and Apple CarPlay and Android Auto smartphone integration, an Alpine nine-speaker premium amplified audio system with subwoofer, leather-trimmed seating surfaces with heating for both front bucket seats and the leather-wrapped steering wheel, and black "Trail Rated 4X4" emblems on both front fenders.

=== Altitude ===
Also introduced in 2020, the Gladiator Altitude is based on the Sport S model. The Altitude features a body-color grille and fender flares, 18-inch Granite Crystal aluminum wheels, and a black hardtop, along with blacked-out interior accents.

=== Willys ===
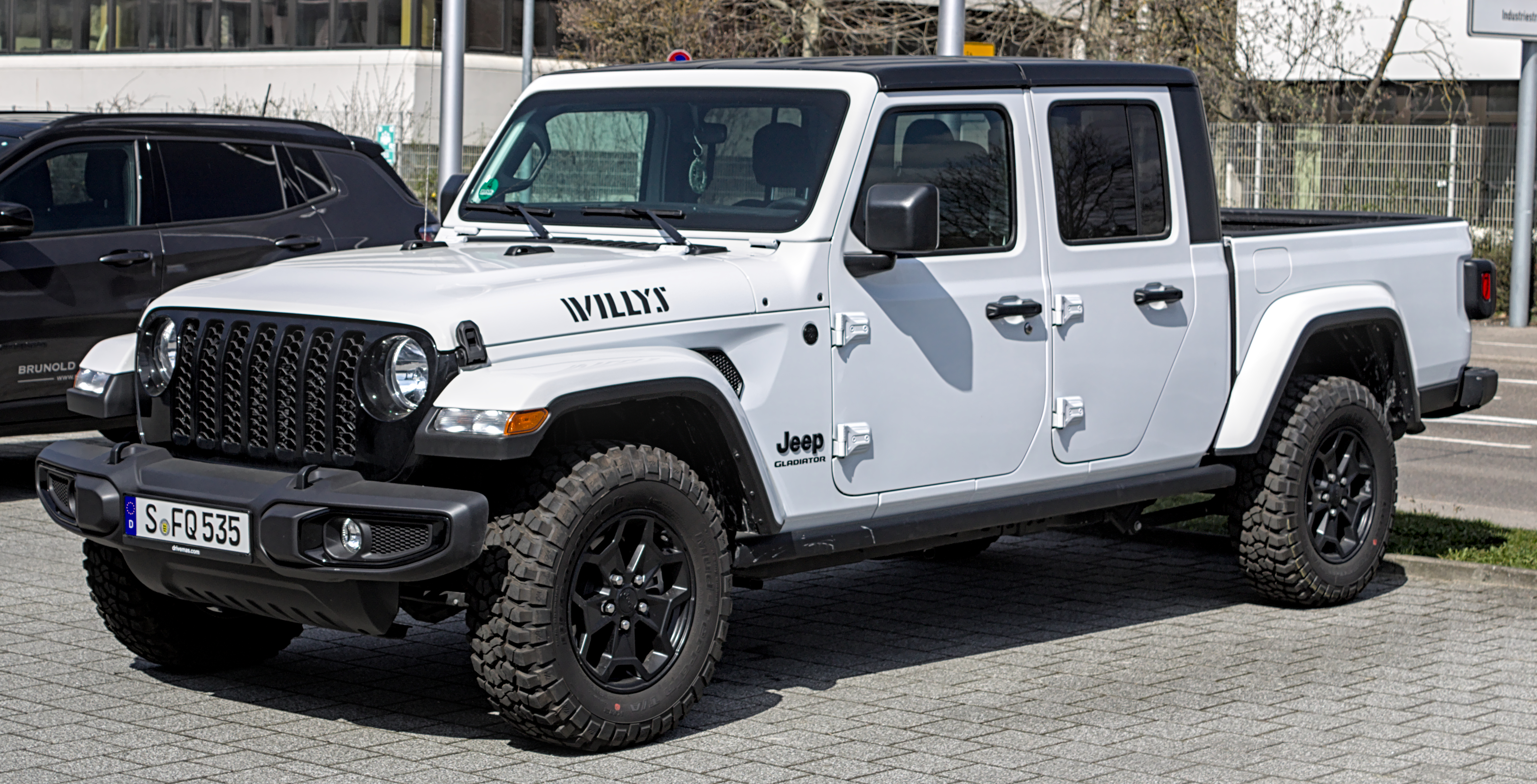
Jeep Gladiator Willys

Introduced in the 2021 lineup, the Gladiator Willys is based on the Sport S model. The Willys sport with a base price of $39,260 features many of the same options as the higher-spec Rubicon, however, including standard Rock Rails and beefy-looking 32-inch BF Goodrich KM2 mud-terrain tires. It also gets a locking rear differential and Jeep's Command-Trac 4x4 part-time, two-speed transfer case with a 2.72:1 low-range gear ratio is also standard fare. The Willys Edition has a hood decal, retro-looking 4WD tailgate decal, 17-inch black aluminum wheels with gray pad print, and a gloss black grille.

=== Sahara ===
The Sahara model is a premium trim level introduced for the 2026 model year. Announced by Jeep on December 19, 2025, the Sahara became the first Gladiator to use the long-established Sahara nameplate, which had previously been reserved for Wrangler models since 1988. Positioned between the Sport S and Willys trims, the Gladiator Sahara combines everyday comfort with Jeep's traditional four-wheel-drive capability. Standard features include body-color fender flares and a body-color hardtop, 18-inch aluminum wheels, leather-trimmed seats, a 12.3-inch Uconnect infotainment system, and the 3.6 L Pentastar V6 engine producing 285 hp (212 kW). The trim is designed to balance on-road refinement, open-air driving, towing capability, and moderate off-road performance while expanding the Gladiator lineup into the premium pickup segment.

=== Texas Trail Edition ===
On April 12, 2021, Jeep introduced the Gladiator Texas Trail, a special edition of the Jeep Gladiator that will only be available in Texas. Based on the Gladiator Sport S trim, the Gladiator Texas Trail has unique 1836 decals to celebrate the state's Declaration of Independence. Standard exterior features include 17-inch Mid-Gloss Black Aluminum wheels, black side steps and hardtop, and Jeep's exclusive “Trail Rated” badge. Jeep also announced that both the Pentastar and EcoDiesel V6 engines will be available for the Gladiator Texas Trail. Starting MSRP is $40,535.

=== FarOut Edition ===
In 2023 Jeep decided to phase out it's 3.0L diesel V6 engine which it had introduced in 2021. This was announced by Jim Morrison, senior vice president and head of Jeep brand North America where he said: “As the Jeep brand continues its drive to electrification, we are phasing out EcoDiesel technology with the final, limited-edition Gladiator Rubicon FarOut." The model was limited to 1,000 vehicles for the 2023 model year and was only available in left-hand drive. Based on the "Rubicon," the "FarOut" Edition featured a commemorative “Diesel 3.0L” hood graphic, exclusive tailgate badging, 17-inch low-gloss black polished aluminum wheels, 33-inch mud-terrain tires, steel front bumper, satin black grille, LED tail lights and other features. In addition to North America, the model was also sold in Europe.

== Recalls ==
On September 13, 2019, FCA announced a recall for the 2020 Jeep Gladiator JT, with approximately 3,427 total Gladiators affected. The Dana Corporation, which manufactures the rear driveshaft for the Gladiator, may have assembled the rear axle monoblocks without grease, which could lead to the potential fracture of the rear driveshaft, leading to a sudden loss of power. Jeep dealers will replace the rear driveshaft on the affected 2020 Gladiator models. The recall covers vehicles built between December 15, 2018, and June 25, 2019. There was a Stop-Sale Order issued for all affected Jeep Gladiator JT models still on dealership lots.

== Sales ==
Calendar year	USA	Canada	Mexico	Australia
2019	40,037	1,950	394	
2020	77,542	4,481	1,325	573
2021	89,712	4,724	1,259	1,273
2022	77,855	4,985		1,397
2023	55,188	3,216	1,820	811
2024	42,123	2,368		
2025	56,790	1,428		
