= AE =

AE, Ae, ae, aE, Æ or æ may refer to:

== Language ==
=== Characters ===
- Æ or æ, a ligature or letter
  - List of English words that may be spelled with a ligature, including "AE" being rendered as "Æ"
- Ä or ä, a letter sometimes represented as "ae"
- Ae (Cyrillic), a Cyrillic-script letter
- Ae (digraph), a Latin-script digraph

=== Languages and dialects ===
- American English, varieties of the English language native to the US; abbr. AE, usually used in contrast to BE (British English)
- Avestan, a language, ISO 639-1 language code ae

=== Words ===
- ae, Lindsay subject version of Spivak pronoun

== Locations ==
- Ae, Dumfries and Galloway, Scotland
  - Water of Ae, a river
- Algeria, LOC MARC code
- United Arab Emirates, ISO 3166-1 and FIPS 10-4 country code AE
  - .ae, the top level domain for United Arab Emirates
- US armed forces in Europe (United States postal abbreviation AE)

== Media and entertainment ==
- A.E. (video game), 1982
- Ae (film), a 2022 Sri Lankan film
- Autechre, an electronic music group
- L'Année épigraphique, a French publication on epigraphy
- Encyclopedia Dramatica, often abbreviated æ
- Artix Entertainment, a video game developer and publisher

== People ==
- A. E. or Æ, a penname of George William Russell (1867–1935), Irish writer
- A. E. Holt White (1851–1933), English writer and illustrator
- A. E. van Vogt (1912–2000), Canadian-American science-fiction writer
- Alexander Emelianenko (born 1981), Russian mixed martial artist, with AE Team

== Science and technology ==
- Acoustic emission, the phenomenon of radiation of acoustic waves in solids
- Adobe After Effects, graphics software
- Adverse event, any untoward medical occurrence in a patient or clinical investigation
- Aeon in astronomy, 10^{9} years
- Almost everywhere, in mathematical analysis
- ASCII Express, computer software
- Authenticated encryption, a form of encryption
- Automatic exposure, a mode available on some cameras
  - Canon AE-1, a camera

== Other uses ==
- Æ or AE, a numismatic abbreviation for "bronze"
- American Eagle, a fashion company abbreviated as AE
- Air Efficiency Award, a British medal 1942–1999
- A US Navy hull classification symbol: Ammunition ship (AE)
- Applied Engineering, a computer hardware retailer
- Mandarin Airlines, a Taiwanese airline, IATA designator AE
- Toyota Corolla, which the "AE" designation is applied to those with Toyota A engine
- Adult education
- Madiun, Ngawi, Magetan, Ponorogo and Pacitan (vehicle registration prefix AE)

== See also ==
- A&E (disambiguation)
- AES (disambiguation)
