= Jeep J8 =

Military vehicle based on the Jeep Wrangler platform

The Jeep J8 is a military vehicle originally based on the Jeep Wrangler JK platform, but currently based on the Jeep Wrangler JL platform. It is also used by government agencies, security groups, peacekeepers, fire departments, underground mining and other industries requiring a heavy duty off-road vehicle. The model was introduced at the Defence Systems & Equipment International (DSEi) trade show on September 13, 2007. The J8 is assembled in Gibraltar by Africa Automotive Distribution Services Limited. AADS has developed and tested the entire range of J8's for deployment to various missions including logistical and front line operations.

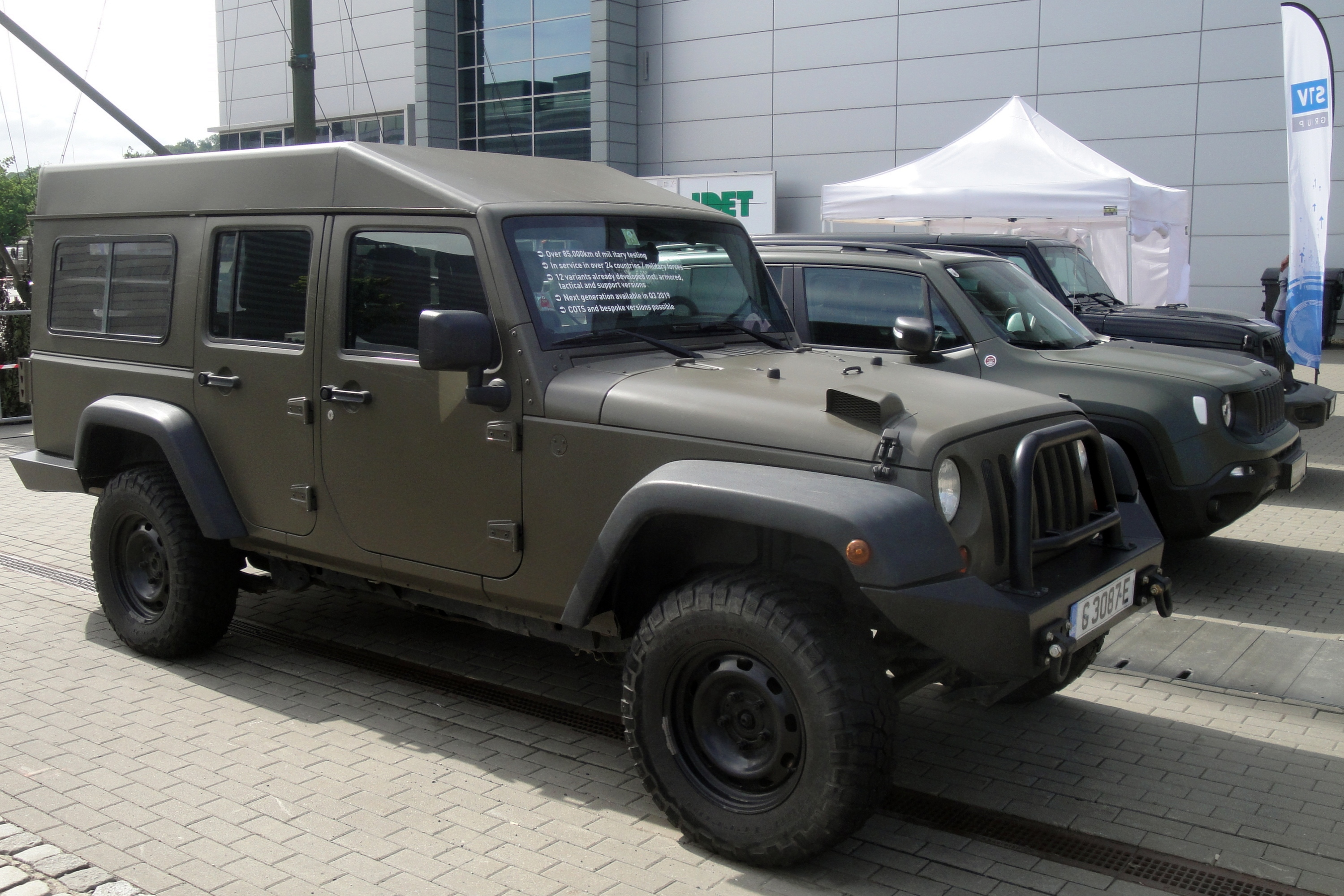
Jeep J8

Recently, the J8 has been submitted as a replacement for the Toyota Tacoma, Toyota Hilux, Mitsubishi Triton, and HMMWV for the US Special Forces.

== Design ==
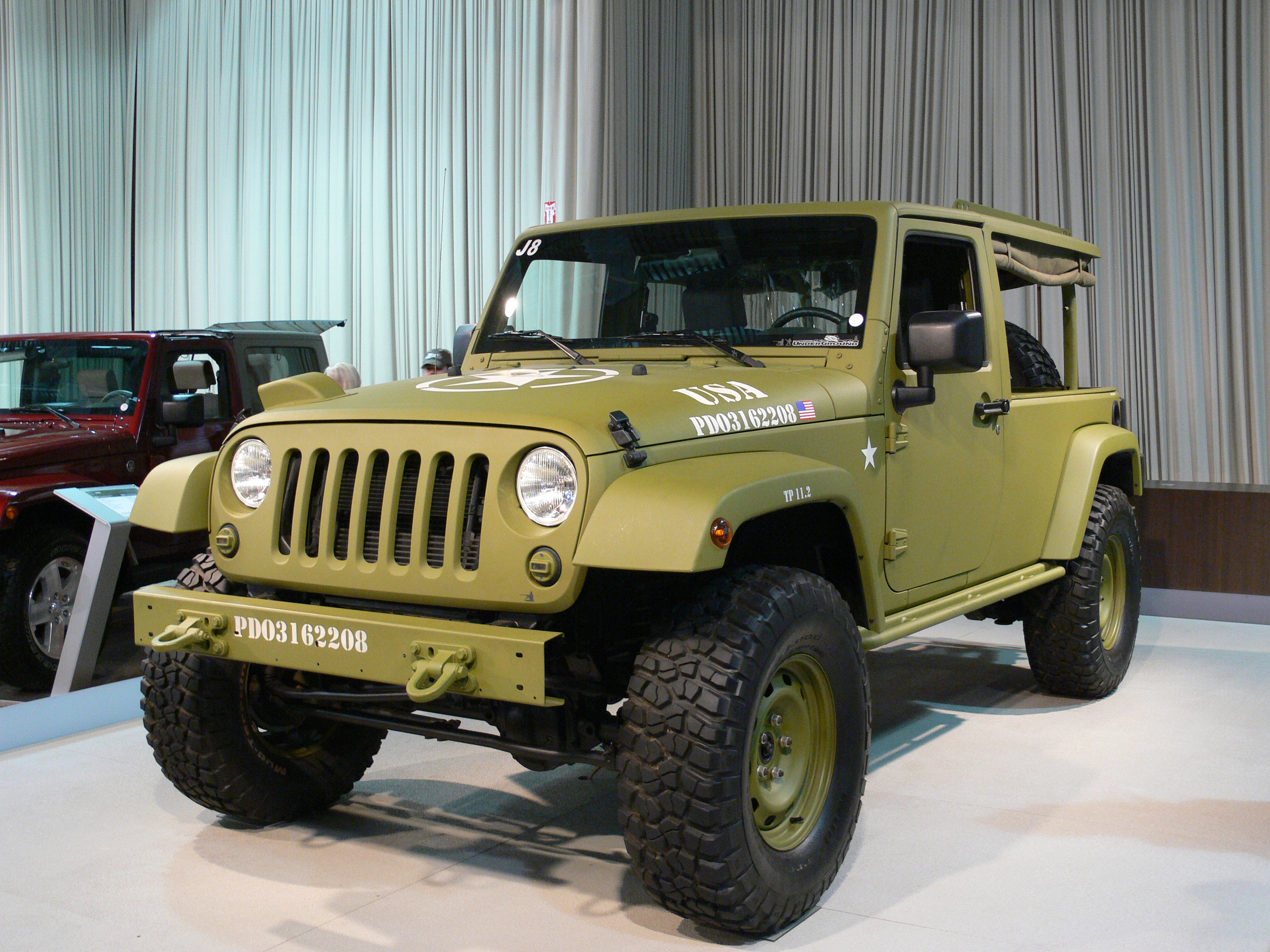
Jeep J8 at the State Fair of Texas 2008, Fair Park, Dallas

The J8 is equipped with larger brakes, axles and suspension components than the civilian version and can be upgraded further depending on the end user requirement. It has a base payload capacity of 1,339 kilograms (2,952 lb) which can be extended for Armoured or Utility variants. The Jeep J8 is powered by a range of petrol and diesel engines, but more commonly the 3 litre V6 diesel power units are used, the latter delivering 260 hp and 600Nm of torque. The engine is mated to an 8-speed automatic transmission.

Available in a number of different variants, the J8 can be produced as a patrol vehicle, utility vehicle, armoured vehicle, and ambulance. All J8 variants have a range of upgrade options to choose from and are designed to be easily transportable by rail, sea, fixed wing aircraft, helicopter (either inside a CH-47 or underslung).

== Production ==
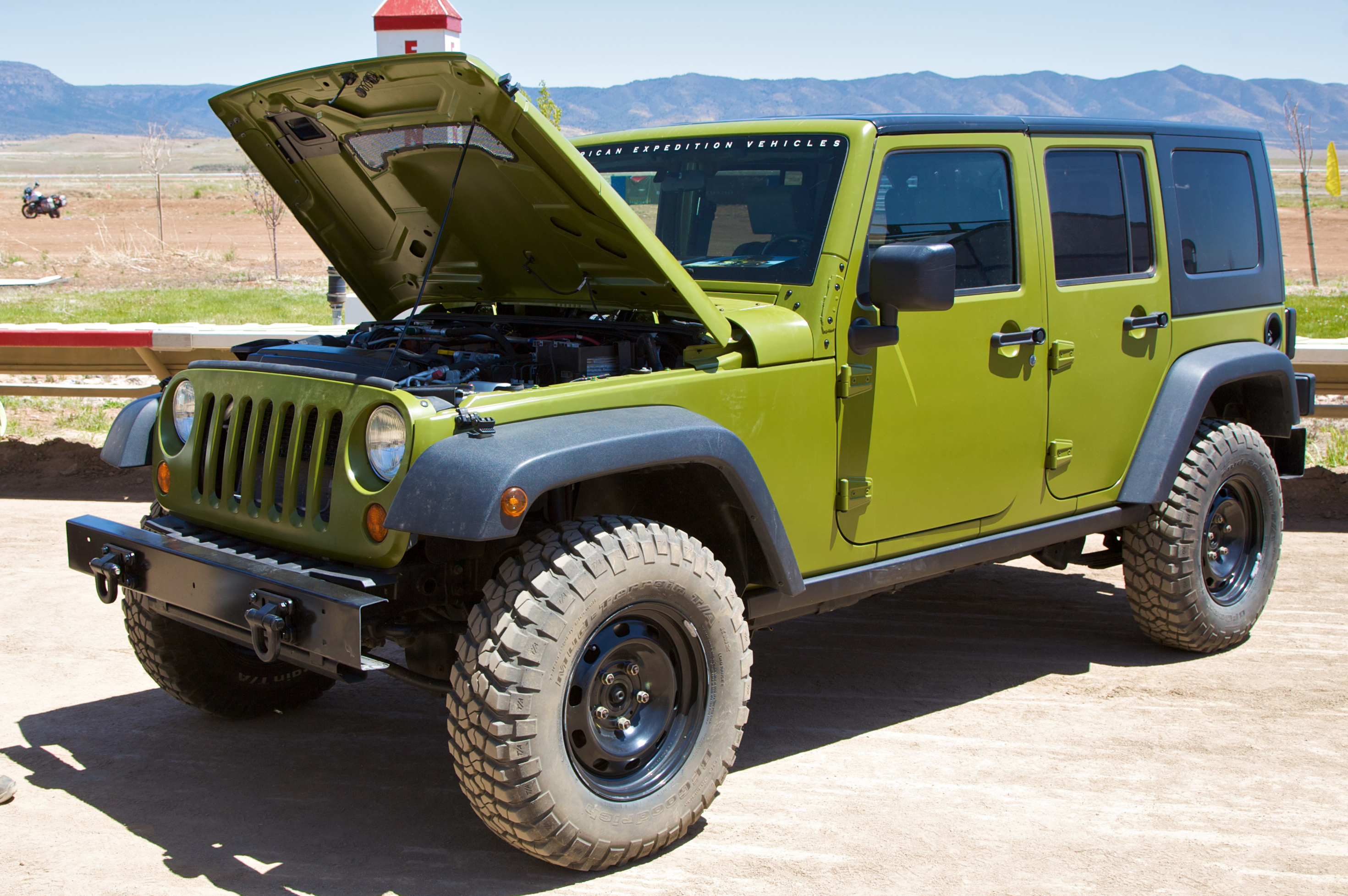
AEV J8 Milspec American Expedition Vehicles version

The first J8 was first planned for assembly at a Chrysler joint-venture facility in Cairo, Egypt. On July 2, 2008, the production version of the Jeep J8 was unveiled at Euro Camp Jeep 2008, a customer event in Mecklenburg-Vorpommern, Germany.

On November 13, 2008, Chrysler LLC and Arab American Vehicles officially announced the manufacturing launch of the Jeep J8 at AAV's assembly plant in Cairo.

The J8 is also assembled in Israel, by Automotive Industries Ltd (AIL) of Nazareth. It is locally badged Storm 3, and will be supplied as a command vehicle to the Israeli Defence Force (IDF). A pair of production J8s was tested by Israeli web magazine Jeepolog.com journalists in April 2009. It was dubbed "probably best Jeep ever". A civilian version was apparently considered for the local Israeli market, but the idea was abandoned.

In 2012 a variant of the Storm 3 was introduced by AIL in Israel under the name Storm 3 Type R. According to Israeli Blog Jeepolog.com, this is a door-less, no windshield Jeep J8, running on 35" tires, and sporting metal tube fenders and roll-cage. It is intended for special forces use in the border patrol, pursuit, and deep strike missions.

American Expedition Vehicles, a Montana-based Jeep aftermarket parts producer, has struck a deal with Chrysler to sell 120 J8 component chassis in the US. These chassis are sold fully assembled but without an engine or transmission. This allows the customer to install or have installed either a 2.8L VM Turbodiesel with 339 lb.-ft. of torque (460 N • m) or a 5.7-liter V-8 Chrysler HEMI. The vehicle can then be legally registered as a "component vehicle".

Since 2019 all J8s are produced by AADS using base vehicles manufactured in the US.

=== Underground mining ===
A special version of the J8 was developed in 2009 by Jeep and VM Motori for the underground mining market. This version is equipped with a version of the 2.8L VM turbodiesel that is approved by MSHA and CANMET for use in underground mines.

== Operators ==
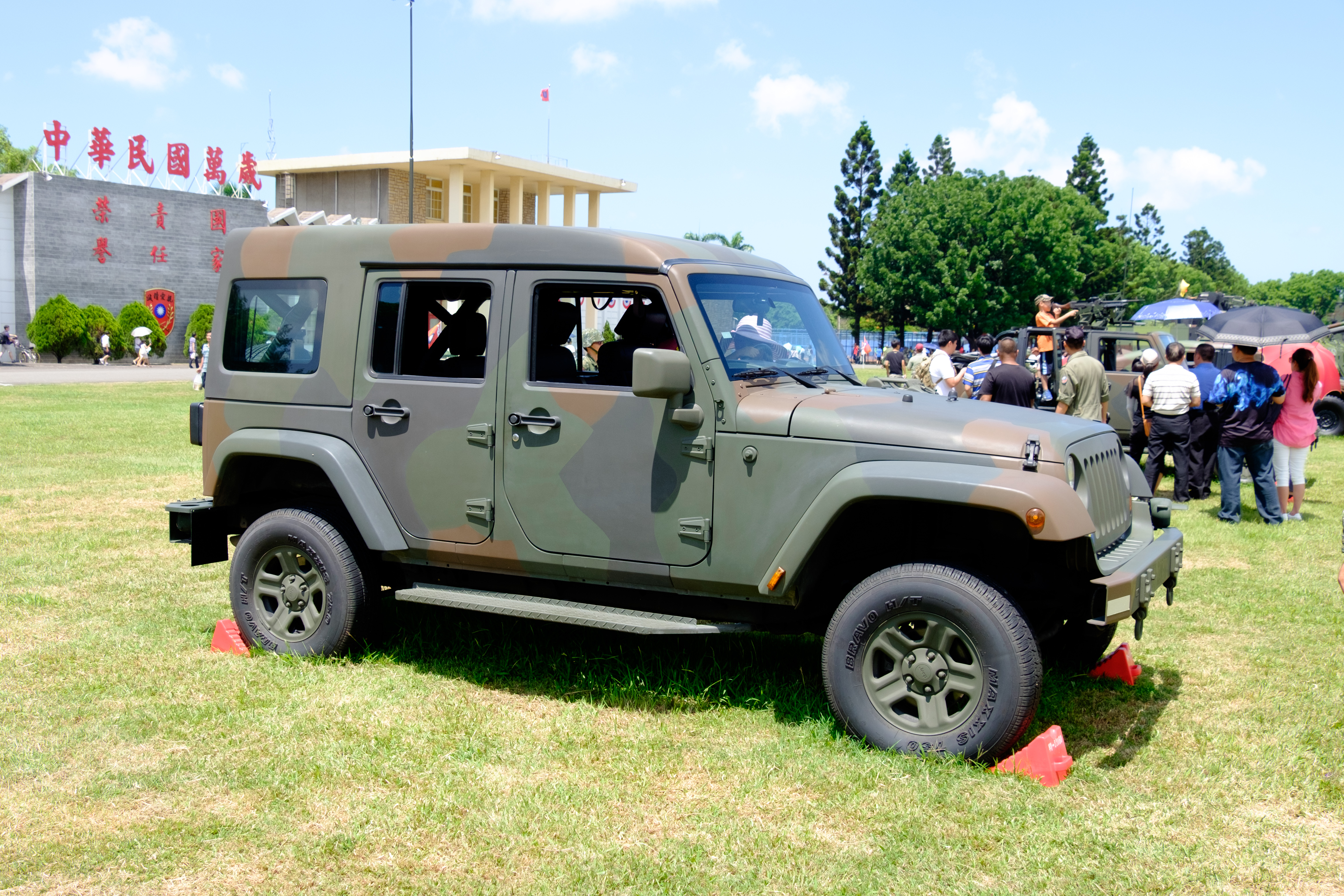
Republic of China Army Wrangler Unlimited

- Belize 7, US-donated to BDF- 3 Jeep J-eight transport vehicles, 3 Jeep J-eight Patrol vehicles, and one Jeep J-eight Ambulance.
- Croatia 5, US-donated to Croatian Army, used for peacekeeping.
- Dominican Republic 15, 5 used by the Dominican Army and 10 used by the Dominican Navy (Marine Infantry Command)
- El Salvador: used by Salvadoran Army.
- Ghana: 40, used by Ghana Armed Forces.
- Italy: 210, used by Italian Army.
- Panama: more than 100 vehicles used by National Border Service (SENAFRONT).
- Guatemala: 250, used by Joint Task Force Tecún Umán, fuerza chorti son a combined military and police force in Guatemala.
- Honduras used by Honduran Army.
- Mongolia: 35, used by Mongolian Armed Forces.
- Peru: 38, used by Peruvian Army
- Taiwan: 3,598, used by the Republic of China Army of local manufacture, built under license by Sanyang Motor Co., Ltd. Manufacturing in Taiwan
- Tajikistan: 5, used by Tajikistan Peacekeeping Battalion

== See also ==
- Commercial Utility Cargo Vehicle
