= Ae Bridgend =

Location in the Scottish council area of Dumfries and Galloway next to the River Ae

Coordinates: 55°09′55″N 3°33′19″W

Ae Bridgend is a hamlet in the Scottish council area of Dumfries and Galloway next to the River Ae. It is located at an altitude of 96.9 m (318 ft) above sea level. It is the place where the trunk A701 road between Dumfries and Moffat crosses the Water of Ae.

== See also ==
- Ae, Scotland
