= Forest of Ae =

Forest in Dumfries and Galloway, Scotland

Coordinates: 55°14′00″N 03°35′00″W

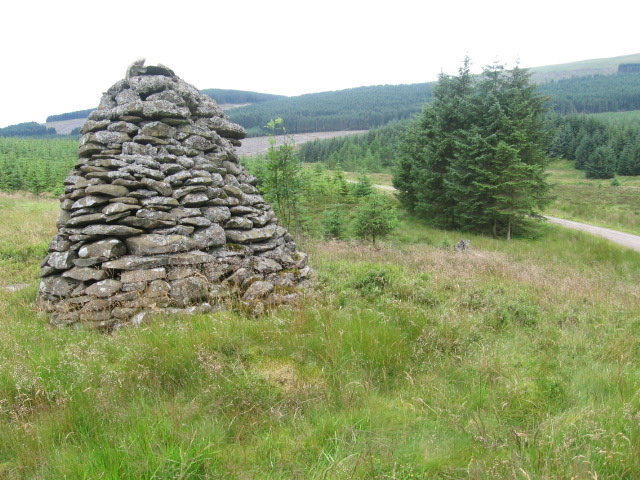
The Blue Cairn on Hound Rig, Forest of Ae

The Forest of Ae is located between Nithsdale and Annandale in Dumfries and Galloway in south-west Scotland.

The forest was first planted in the 1920s, primarily with Sitka spruce. It has the designation of a 'Priority Forest' for Red Squirrel conservation. The land on which the forest is situated acts as a drainage basin for the Water of Ae, which has a thriving population of otters.

The village of Ae was built in the 1940s to house forestry workers.

A variety of mountain bike trails have been built as part of Forestry and Land Scotland's 7stanes project that ranges from beginner trails to highly advanced trails. Forest of Ae has also been a staple location for stages in the Scottish Downhill association.
