= AES =

AES most often refers to:

- Advanced Encryption Standard, or Rijndael, a specification for electronic data encryption

AES may also refer to:

== Businesses and organizations ==
=== Companies ===
- AES Andes, formerly AES Gener, a Chilean electricity company
- AES Corporation, an American electricity company
- AES Data, former owner of Daisy Systems Holland
- AES Eletropaulo, a former Brazilian electricity company
- AES Hawaii, an American electricity company
- American Education Services, part of the Pennsylvania Higher Education Assistance Agency
- Asian Educational Services, an Indian publisher

=== Schools ===
- Academy of Environmental Science, in Crystal River, Florida, U.S.
- AES Algiers, in Algeria
- American Embassy School, New Delhi, India
- Ascension Episcopal School, in Louisiana, U.S.
- Assumption English School, in Bukit Panjang, Singapore
- Ayden Elementary School, in Ayden, North Carolina

=== Other organizations ===
- Academic Evaluation Services, a global foreign academic credential and translation services provider
- AES Group, now AES+F, a Russian artist collective
- Amateur Entomologists' Society, a British organisation
- American Elasmobranch Society, a professional society
- American Epilepsy Society
- Association of European Sommeliers
- Audio Engineering Society, an American professional society

== Science and technology ==
- Acoustic echo suppression, in telephony
- Advanced electronic signature, an EU-compliant electronic signature system
- AES (Advanced Entertainment System), a home version of the Neo Geo video game platform
- Agricultural experiment station, a type of research center
- Algebraic entry system, a calculator input method
- Alkaline earth silicate, a mineral wool
- Application Environment Services, a component of the 1980s GEM computer desktop environment
- Atomic emission spectroscopy, a method of chemical analysis
- Auger electron spectroscopy, in surface chemistry and materials science
- Automated Enforcement System, a road safety enforcement system in Malaysia
- Automated essay scoring, the use of computers to assign grades
- Automated Export System, an American exports information system

== Other uses ==
- Abdul El-Sayed (born 1984), American doctor, politician, and United States senator-elect from Michigan
- Actually existing socialism, a catchphrase coined by Leonid Brezhnev to refer to Soviet-style economic planning
- "Aes", a 1999 song by Skepticism
- AES Railcar, a Chilean railcar
- Ålesund Airport, Vigra (IATA airport code AES), in Møre og Romsdal County, Norway
- Alliance of Sahel States (French: l'Alliance des États du Sahel), an alliance comprising Mali, Niger, and Burkina Faso
- Alsea language, ISO 639-3 code aes
- Alternative Economic Strategy, proposed in the 1970s by British politician Tony Benn
- Hainai, a Native American tribe sometimes also called the Aes
