= A&E =

A&E or A+E may refer to:

== Music ==
- A&E Records, a British record label
- A+E (album), 2012, by Graham Coxon
- "A&E" (song), 2008, by Goldfrapp
- "A+E" (song), 2012, by Clean Bandit

== Television ==
- A&E Networks, an American broadcasting company
  - A&E (TV network), an American pay TV network
  - A&E (German TV channel)
  - A&E (Spanish and Portuguese TV channel)
  - A&E (Australian TV channel)

== Other uses ==
- Accident and emergency, a term for a hospital's emergency department

== See also ==
- AE (disambiguation)
- ANE (disambiguation)
