= AEV Prospector =

Pickup truck made by American Exepedition Vehicles

The AEV Prospector is an American off-road full-size pickup truck produced by American Expedition Vehicles and based on the Ram pickup.
