= Academic Evaluation Services =

Global organization

- Founded: 2005
- Location(s): Tampa, Florida New York, New York Houston, Texas
- Region served: Worldwide
- Products: Foreign Credential Services; Translation
- Website: www.aes-edu.org

Academic Evaluation Services (AES) is a global organization that provides evaluations of foreign academic credential and translation services. The organization is a member of the National Association of Credential Evaluation Services (NACES), the European Association for International Education (EAIE), and the NAFSA: Association of International Educators, formerly known as the National Association of Foreign Student Advisers.

== Background ==
Founded in 2005, AES was created with a focus on foreign credential evaluations, international admissions, foreign student advising, university placement, and translations. AES is based in the United States, with its headquarters in Tampa, Florida. There are two receiving offices in New York City and Houston, Texas. The company provides services to clients all over the world in need of international credential evaluations for academic studies, employment, immigration, military and professional licensing. AES works with universities and institutions throughout the United States.

Credential evaluators such as AES determine the U.S. equivalency of foreign qualifications through document-by-document or course-by-course evaluations. U.S. Citizenship and Immigration Services officers, who are not academic specialists, may rely on such evaluations when adjudicating cases that involve foreign degrees.

International students have a substantial economic impact on the United States. NAFSA estimated their contribution at $18.8 billion for the 2009–2010 academic year, and at about $43.8 billion for the 2023–2024 academic year, when international students were reported to support more than 378,000 jobs. AES facilitates the evaluation of educational equivalencies that U.S. academic institutions, employers, professional licensing boards, immigration services, and the military rely on.

The mission of AES is to provide academic evaluation and translation services to foreign educated individuals so they may further their education and professional careers in the United States. Individuals who completed their education outside of the U.S. must have their credentials evaluated into U.S. academic equivalents so they can be recognized by U.S. educational institutions, employers, licensing and professional boards, immigration authorities, and the military. AES conducts thousands of evaluations annually for individuals from countries worldwide.
