= AEV Brute =

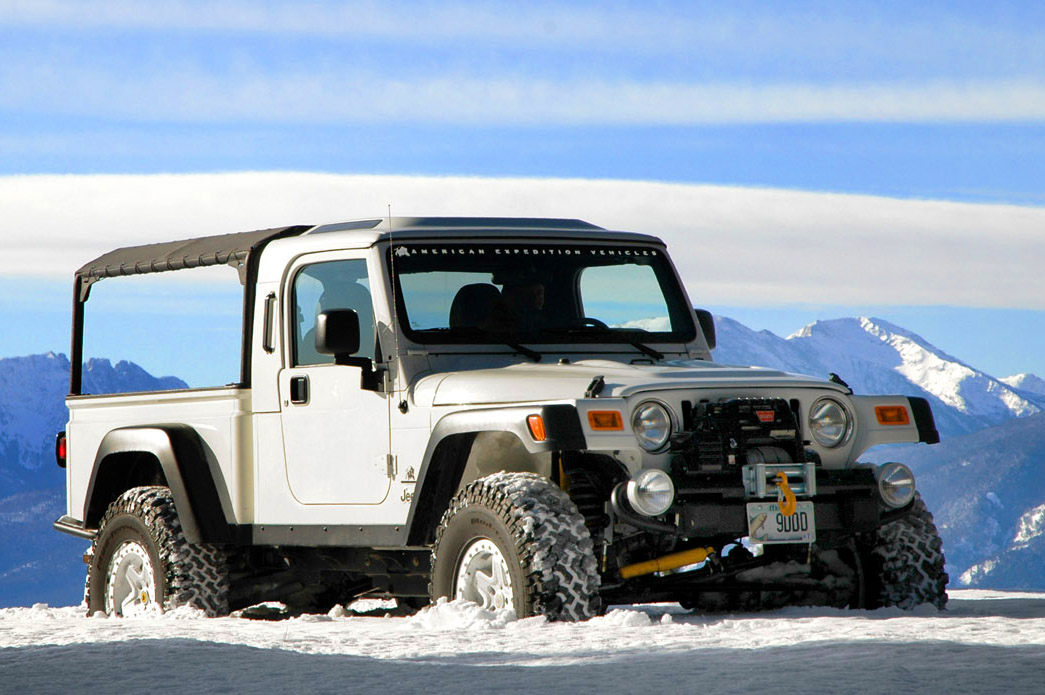

Overview
- Manufacturer: American Expedition Vehicles
- Production: 2011-present
- Model years: 2011-present

Body and chassis
- Class: Compact pickup truck
- Body style: 2-door Pickup truck 4-door Pickup truck
- Layout: Front engine, four-wheel drive
- Related: Jeep Wrangler; AIL Storm

Powertrain
- Engine: 4.0L In-line six 3.6L Pentastar V6; 5.7L HEMI V8; 6.4L 392 HEMI V8
- Transmission: 42RLE 4-speed automatic NSG370 6-speed manual 545RFE 5-speed automatic W5A580 5-speed automatic

Dimensions
- Wheelbase: 139.0 in (3,531 mm)
- Length: 216.0 in (5,486 mm)

The AEV Brute is an all-terrain compact pickup truck built by American Expedition Vehicles.

== History ==
The first American Expedition Vehicles (AEV) Brute was built in 2004 after the company was founded in 1997. More information on the history of AEV can be found on the American Expedition Vehicles page here on wiki. The AEV Brute is a pickup truck that is modified from the Jeep Wrangler SUV platform. It was offered for both the Wrangler TJ and JK models. American parts and vehicles producer AEV first developed a single cab versions, on a stretched Wrangler TJ chassis, which was made available mostly in kit-form, although completely modified Wrangler Brute pickups could also be ordered from AEV, from about 2007 to 2011. In 2011 AEV developed a significantly larger double cab pickup, based on a stretched JK Wrangler Unlimited chassis, which was available for four years, from 2013 to 2017.

== Build process ==
The build process for an AEV TJ based Brute was built in stages or all at once with a kit. The kit included items such as a mid-frame section, a cab closeout, a single cab hardtop, a bed and tailgate, and body mounts. The conversion process started with a 1997–2006 Jeep Wrangler which then had the interior parts removed to allow access to the floor of the vehicle. Continuing with drilling out spot welds and cutting sections of the floor and sides of the tub the body can be removed. With the body removed the frame extension would need to be welded in by cutting a section of frame and making sure everything is straight. The front section of the tub can be placed back onto the extended frame once the cab closeout is installed. The bed can be installed and adjusted before final alignment. Paint and body work is one of the last stages that will take place. The interior can also be installed to complete the conversion.

== Options and packages ==
=== 1997 - 2006 AEV Brute Options (TJ Wrangler Based) ===
An option to the AEV TJ based Brute was a Highline kit. This kit raised the fenders approximately 3 inches to allow the vehicle to have a smaller lift while still having large tires. As Four Wheeler Magazine would write "A newer and nicer way to go would be to opt for the AEV highline kit which actually provides you with factory-quality stamped-steel highline fenders that bolt in place of your stock units." AEV offered the Brute with a range of engine choices including either the factory 4.0L I6 or a 5.7L HEMI V8.

=== 2013 - 2017 AEV Brute Packages (JK Wrangler Based) ===
The factory could out fit a Double Cab (DC) Brute with the factory 3.6L Pentastar V6, a 5.7L HEMI V8, or a 6.4L 392 HEMI V8. Some packages that were available were listed below.

- DC 250
- DC 350
- Filson Edition

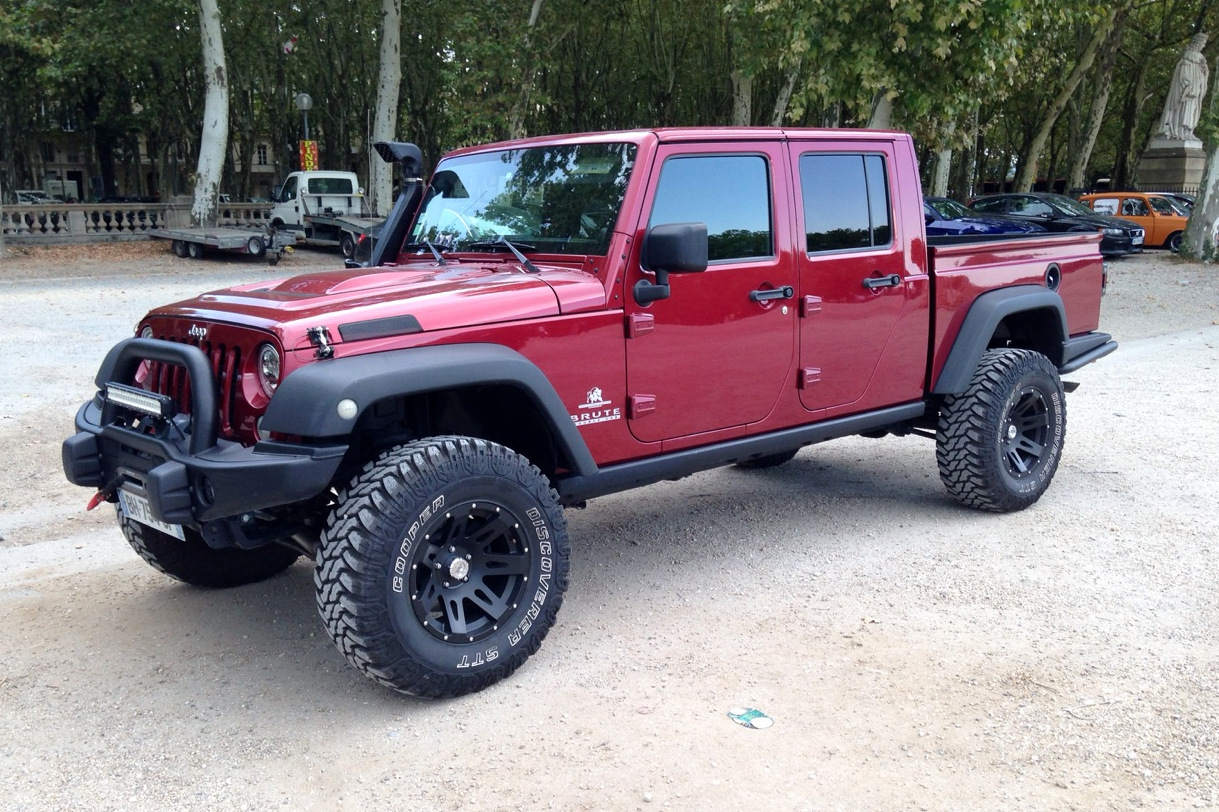
AEV's JK Unlimited based Brute pickup
