= Brites Anes =

Mistress of John II of Portugal

Brites Anes de Santarém (born c. 1460), also known as A Boa Dona ("The Good Lady"), was a mistress of King John II of Portugal, with whom she had one daughter, Brites Anes de Santarém.

Her daughter married Amador Baracho Correia, lord of Torre de Vale de Esteio, which resulted in the birth D. Brites Anes Baracho, heiress of her parents, who married João Pires Amado, a nobleman from the house of Infante D. Afonso. The Portuguese singer-songwriter Tiago Bettencourt is a descendant of this line.
