= Ane =

Ane or ane may refer to:

- Āne, a village in Latvia
- Ane, Netherlands, a village in Overijssel, Netherlands, also
  - Battle of Ane (1227), a battle fought near the village
- -ane, a suffix in organic chemistry, or specifically
  - Alkanes, which take this suffix
- Aun, a mythological king of Sweden
- Ane River, a river in Shiga Prefecture, Japan

The acronym ANE may refer to:

- Acute necrotizing encephalopathy
- Ancient Near East
- The All Night Express, a wrestling stable in ROH
- Ancient North Eurasian, archaeogenetic lineage
- Angers – Loire Airport, Angers, France (IATA airport code ANE)
- Anoka County–Blaine Airport, Minneapolis, Minnesota, United States (FAA airport code ANE)
- Anthro New England, annual furry convention in northeast America
- Ancient North Eurasian archaeogenetic name for an ancestral genetic component

== See also ==
- A&E (disambiguation)
- Ah neh, a Singaporean ethnic slur for an Indian person
