= Ae, Dumfries and Galloway =

Village in Dumfries and Galloway, south west Scotland

Coordinates: 55.186°N 3.597°W

Ae
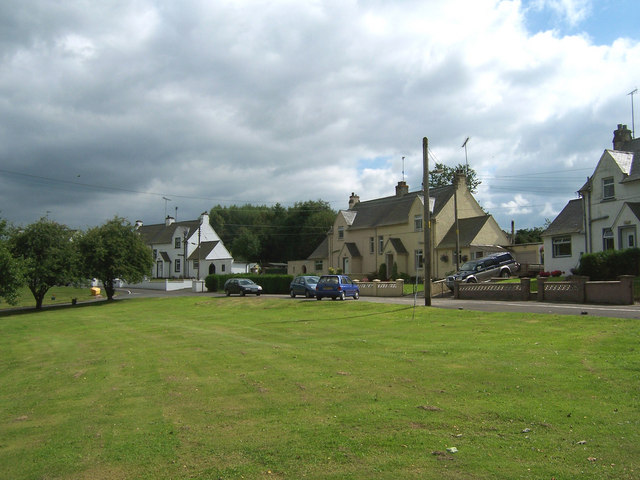
- The village of Ae

- Location within Dumfries and Galloway
- Population: 200 (approx)
- OS grid reference: NX983891
  - Edinburgh: 70 mi (110 km) NE
  - London: 340 mi (550 km) SE
- Council area: Dumfries and Galloway
- Lieutenancy area: Dumfries
- Country: Scotland
- Sovereign state: United Kingdom
- Post town: DUMFRIES
- Postcode district: DG1
- Dialling code: 01387
- Police: Scotland
- Fire: Scottish
- Ambulance: Scottish
- UK Parliament: Dumfries and Galloway
- Scottish Parliament: Dumfriesshire

Ae (pronounced /eɪ/) is a village in Dumfries and Galloway, south west Scotland. The village is located on the edge of a 15,000-acre (61 km^{2}) human-made conifer forest, and is approximately 9 miles (14 km) north of Dumfries.

== History ==
Robert Chambers wrote of the Ae area in 1826, describing it as a moor with a glen (known as Glenae), whose inhabitants were "long famed for broils, battles, and feats of activity". Chambers wrote that most men in the area were employed in farming and transporting goods on horseback between the village and Glasgow, as well as the cities of Carlisle and Manchester. These "lads of Ae" had a reputation that preceded them, being famous for "cudgel-playing [and] boxing" at every fair and wedding the area held.

The village of Ae is one of the youngest villages in Britain, having been founded in 1947 by the Forestry Commission.

== Geography ==
The village is situated between the Water of Ae and the Goukstane Burn after they have flowed out of the Forest of Ae. The population is approximately 200, with 50 dwellings. Facilities in the village include a public house (formerly the post office), a school and community hall.

Experiments at Ae include successful afforestation of former peat bogs, formerly thought to be unplantable. Plantation has also been established at a height of 1,750 feet (530 m). The forest consists mainly of Sitka spruce, but there are also larch, Scots pine, and Norway spruce. There is much wildlife, including deer, fox, hare, weasel, woodpigeon, yellowhammer, sparrowhawk, jay, pheasant, partridge and red squirrel.

=== Toponymy ===
In 1787, the area's name was written with the ligature Æ. By 1826 the name was written as Ae which, by repute, is the shortest place name in the United Kingdom. However the Scottish Gaelic name of the island of Iona comprises a single letter, Ì, and there is also a river in the Scottish Highlands called the E.

The name likely comes from the Old Norse word á, meaning 'water'.

=== Mountain biking trails ===
Close to the village is the local area headquarters of the Forestry Commission. The commission has been instrumental in developing a mountain biking centre, which provides access to cycle trails of various difficulty. To cater for visitors, there is a small café and a bike shop.

=== Wheelchair accessible walks ===
There is a 3 1/2-mile (5.6 km) long wheelchair accessible circular trail along the Ae riverside from the main car park where there is disabled parking. The path is wide and generally flat and consists of a combination of cinder and compacted gravel tracks with very few low obstacles and slight inclines. The route is suitable for manual wheelchair users, just follow the yellow post markers. There is also the option of parking at the upper/overflow car park, shortening the walk to less than 2 1/2 miles (4 km) and avoiding the first part of the trail which is shared with vehicles. For the more adventurous with "off road" wheelchairs the yellow trail can be extended by following the green mountain bike trail markers up to Dan's pool and back.

== See also ==
- Ae Bridgend

== Sources ==
- Reader's Digest Association (1990), Book of British Villages, London: Reader's Digest, ISBN 0-276-42018-7, OCLC 35330841
- Chambers, Robert (1826), The Popular Rhymes of Scotland, W. Hunte
- Great Britain House of Lords (1787), Journals of the House of Lords / Great Britain, Parliament, House of Lords, vol. 38, HMSO
- Pye, Kenneth; Croft, Debra (2004), Forensic geoscience: principles, techniques and applications, London: Geological Society, ISBN 1-86239-161-0
