= Water of Ae =

River in the United Kingdom

Coordinates: 55°09′N 3°27′W

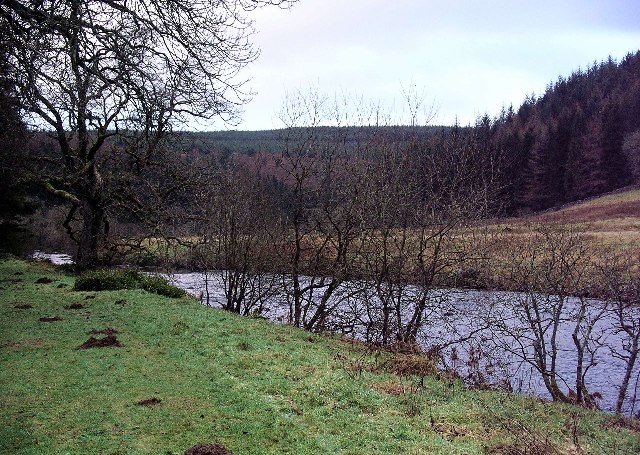
The Water of Ae, flowing through the Forest of Ae north of Ae village

The Water of Ae is a tributary of the River Annan into which it flows west of Lockerbie in Dumfries and Galloway administrative county of South West Scotland in the United Kingdom. It rises on the eastern slopes of Queensberry.
