= American Expedition Vehicles =

American off-road and overland vehicle manufacturer

- Type: Privately held company
- Industry: Automotive industry
- Founded: 1997
- Founder: Dave Harriton
- Headquarters: Missoula, Montana
- Area served: North America & Caribbean Region
- Key people: Dave Harriton (President), Michael Chetcuti (Owner), Michael Collins (Owner)
- Products: Pickup trucks, Aftermarket accessories, stamped steel off-road bumpers, off-road suspension systems, engine conversions, wheels, knives, T-shirts
- Website: aev-conversions.com

American Expedition Vehicles (AEV) was founded in 1997 in Montana, United States, and is a manufacturer of off-road and overland vehicle parts and accessories, as well as turnkey off-road vehicle packages, primarily based on Jeep Wranglers, but since 2015 also on Ram Pickups. Michael Chetcuti and business partner, Michael Collins, bought into the 15-year-old business in 2006 as partners with founder Dave Harriton.

All AEV parts are designed and tested in Missoula, Montana, where the company's R&D facilities are located. In 2007, AEV expanded near Detroit, Michigan by establishing a corporate office, vehicle build facility, and warehouse in Commerce Township and Wixom, Michigan. Today, over 90% of their products are manufactured within 200 miles of Detroit.

== Automotive models ==
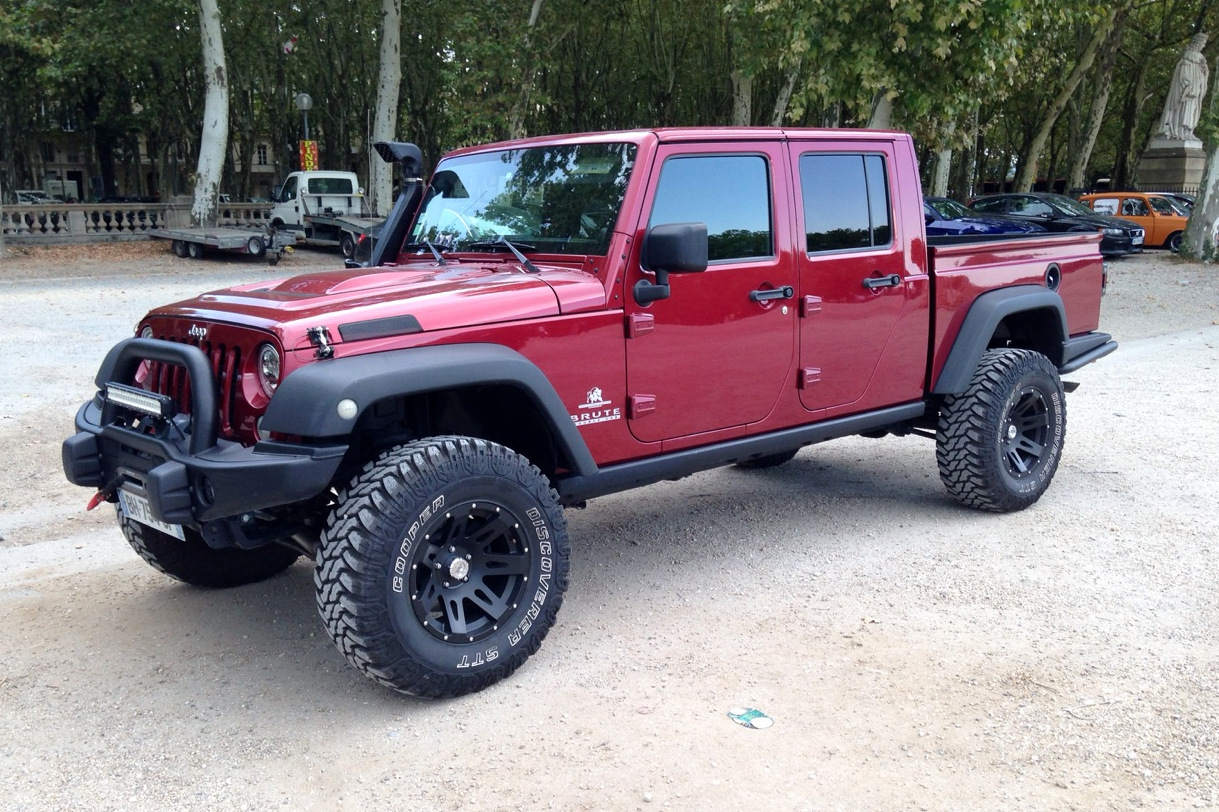
AEV's JK Unlimited based Brute pickup

=== Jeep Wrangler JK based ===
- AEV Wrangler JK200/JK250/JK350
- AEV Filson Edition Wrangler

In 2011 AEV presented their first concept for an extended, double cab pickup, based on the Wrangler Unlimited. The AEV Brute Double Cab DC250 and DC350 went into production in 2013, later augmented with a Filson Edition. Production of the JK-based Brute was retired after four years in 2017.

=== Ram Pickup based ===
- AEV Prospector
- AEV Prospector XL

== See also ==
- Jeep Wrangler
