= Allandale =

Allandale may refer to:

== Places ==
=== Australia ===
- Allendale, Victoria (also known as Allandale), a town in Victoria, Australia
  - Electoral district of Allandale
- Allandale, New South Wales, a locality in the Hunter Valley

=== Canada ===
- Allandale (Toronto), an historic house in Toronto, Canada
- Allandale, a former village in Innisfil (1891) settled in 1850s then annexed to Barrie, Ontario in 1896 and now a neighbourhood within Barrie

=== New Zealand ===
- Allandale, Christchurch, a settlement near Governors Bay, Banks Peninsula, Christchurch City
- Allandale, Mackenzie, a settlement near Fairlie, Mackenzie District
- Allandale, Whakatāne, a suburb within the town of Whakatāne, Whakatāne District

=== United Kingdom ===
- Allandale, Falkirk, a village in Falkirk, Scotland, United Kingdom

=== United States ===
- Allandale, Austin, Texas, a neighbourhood in Austin, Texas, USA
- Allandale, Florida, a community in Volusia County, Florida, USA

=== US Virgin Islands ===
- Allandale, United States Virgin Islands, a settlement on the island of Saint Croix, United States Virgin Islands

== See also ==
- Alan Dale (disambiguation)
- Allendale (disambiguation)
- Allandale station (disambiguation)
