= Allendale =

Allendale may refer to:

== Places ==
=== Australia ===
- Allendale, Victoria, a town
- Allendale North, South Australia, north of Kapunda
- Allendale East, South Australia, south of Mount Gambier

=== Canada ===
- Allendale, Edmonton, a neighbourhood

=== England ===
- Allendale, Northumberland

=== United States ===
- Allendale, Oakland, California, former community now part of Oakland, California
- Allendale, Solano County, California, census-designated place
- Allendale, Gwinnett County, Georgia, unincorporated community
- Allendale, Muscogee County, Georgia, unincorporated community
- Allendale, Illinois, village
- Allendale, Indiana, unincorporated community
- Allendale, Louisiana, a neighborhood in Shreveport, Louisiana
- Allendale, Michigan, census-designated place
- Allendale Charter Township, Michigan
- Allendale, Missouri, city
- Allendale, New Jersey, borough
- Allendale, South Carolina, town
- Allendale, West Virginia
- Allendale County, South Carolina
- The former name of Kissimmee, Florida, before its incorporation in 1883

== Other uses ==
- Allendale, a version of the Intel Core 2 microprocessor
- Viscount Allendale, a title in the peerage of the United Kingdom
- Allendale (house), heritage residence in Auckland, New Zealand

== See also ==
- Alan Dale (disambiguation)
- Allandale (disambiguation)
- Allandale station (disambiguation)
