= Algebuckina =

Algebuckina may refer to:

- Algebuckina, South Australia, a town
- Algebuckina Bridge, a heritage-listed bridge in South Australia
