= Dalhousie Station (South Australia) =

Former pastoral lease in South Australia

Coordinates: 26.4224°S 135.5031°E

Location in South Australia

Dalhousie Station, most commonly known as Dalhousie Springs Station, was a pastoral lease that once operated as a cattle station in South Australia. Dalhousie and other surrounding leases were acquired by the Australian Government in 1985 to make up Witjira National Park.

The property was situated approximately 125 kilometres (78 mi) north of Oodnadatta and 131 kilometres (81 mi) south east of Aputula. The ephemeral Finke River passes for a distance of 30 miles (48 km) through the property with several semi-permanent water holes, before petering out well short of Lake Eyre further to the south east.

The lease was initially won by Edward Meade Bagot in 1873. Bagot was a surveyor who had won the contract to construct the 500 miles (805 km) section of the Overland Telegraph from Port Augusta to the Peak.

Bagot and Smith put the 1,738-square-mile (4,501 km^{2}) property on the market in 1889. At this time the station was stocked with 5,000 head of cattle and 130 horses.

The property was acquired by the Lewis family and in 1904 was being managed by A. Ross. R. Sandford was running the property in 1924; the same year good rains fell, filling the water-holes along the Finke.

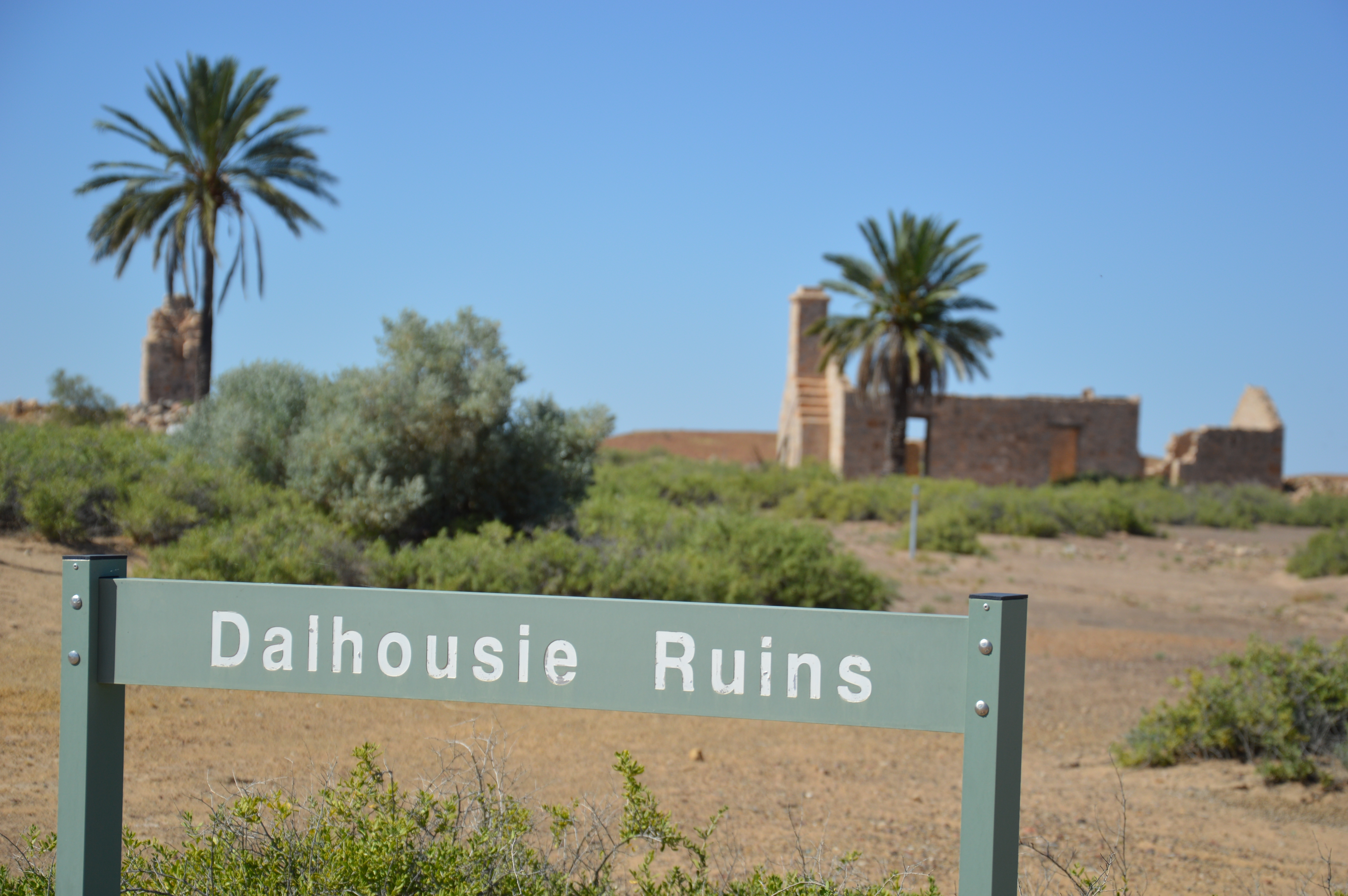
Dalhousie Ruins on the station

In 1908 the area of the station was estimated as being 1,500 square miles (3,885 km^{2}) along with the 20 square miles (52 km^{2}) of springs that are found on the property. In the same year massive floods caused a huge tract of land 40 miles (64 km) long and the same width including parts neighbouring Macumba Station to be submerged following heavy rains in the area. Nearby Todmorden Station recorded a fall of 6.5 inches (165 mm) in a 24-hour period.

The Dalhousie Homestead Ruins are listed on the South Australian Heritage Register.

== See also ==
- List of ranches and stations
