= Lambina =

Pastoral lease in South Australia

Coordinates: 26.922°S 134.208°E

Location in South Australia

Lambina Station is a pastoral lease that once operated as a sheep station but now operates as a cattle station in outback South Australia.

It is located approximately 70 kilometres (43 mi) north east of Marla and 150 kilometres (93 mi) north west of Oodnadatta. The property shares a boundary with Granite Downs to the west and Todmorden Station to the east. The ephemeral Alberga River runs through the property.

Currently the property occupies an area of 4,047 square kilometres (1,563 sq mi). It consists of a mixture of gibber plains and Pedirka desert country that has an average annual rainfall of 177 millimetres (7 in).

Lambina had been established prior to 1905. In 1906 the owner, Joseph H. Harding, sold off his stock from the property that was in the grip of drought. Harding started restocking the following year and took delivery of 1,580 sheep and 10 horses early in 1908. By 1914 the property was owned by T. Williams, and it was again struck by drought in 1925. Williams died in 1925 as result of an accident at Mount Wellbourne Station. Later the same year the property was acquired by Joe Harden, and in 1927 a total of 22 truckloads of cattle were sold off the property an sent to market. By 1934 the property was owned by A. J. Robb, who had a circular fence built around the homestead to protect it from drift sand. After heavy rains in the area in 1938 the homestead and a car belong to Mr Paige, the station manager, were buried under 6 feet (2 m) of mud. Mr Paige and his workers were also stranded for three days until trucks carrying supplies arrived.

Bushfires raged through the area in 2011 with approximately 50,000 hectares (123,553 acres) of grazing lands lost to the flames at Lambina. Lightning strikes initiated the fire which burnt for nearly two weeks before a 40 kilometres (25 mi) backburn helped bring it under control.

In 2012 the owner, Alan Fennell, had the unimproved land value checked by an independent assessor after the government wanted to increase land rents by some 200%. The valuer general assessed it as A$380,000, whereas the independent valuer arrived at A$50,000.

The land occupying the extent of the Lambina pastoral lease was gazetted as a locality in April 2013 under the name 'Lambina'.

== See also ==
- List of ranches and stations
