= Goodenia lobata =

Scientific classification
- Kingdom: Plantae
- Clade: Tracheophytes
- Clade: Angiosperms
- Clade: Eudicots
- Clade: Asterids
- Order: Asterales
- Family: Goodeniaceae
- Genus: Goodenia
- Species: G. lobata

Binomial name
- Goodenia lobata Ising

Species of flowering plant

Goodenia lobata is a species of flowering plant in the family Goodeniaceae and is endemic to the South Australia. It is an ascending to low-lying perennial herb with linear to lance-shaped at the base of the plant and racemes of yellow flowers.

== Description ==
Goodenia lobata is an ascending to low-lying perennial herb that typically grows to a height of 4–25 cm (1.6–9.8 in) and has stems up to 20 cm (7.9 in) long. The leaves are arranged at the base of the plant and are linear to lance-shaped, 40–70 mm (1.6–2.8 in) long and 2–4 mm (0.079–0.157 in) wide, sometimes with lobed edges. The flowers are arranged singly in leaf axils or in racemes, each flower on a pedicel 10–35 mm (0.39–1.38 in) long with leaf-like bracts. The sepals are lance-shaped, 3–4 mm (0.12–0.16 in) long and the corolla is yellow with a darker centre and 14–16 mm (0.55–0.63 in) long. The lower lobes of the corolla are about 3 mm (0.12 in) long with wings about 1.5 mm (0.059 in) wide. Flowering occurs from July to September and the fruit is a more or less spherical capsule about 5 mm (0.20 in) in diameter.

== Taxonomy ==
Goodenia lobata was first formally described by botanist Ernest Horace Ising in 1958 in the Transactions of the Royal Society of South Australia. The type specimen was collected by Ising south-west of Oodnadatta. The specific epithet (lobata) means "lobed".

== Distribution and habitat ==
This goodenia grows in scrub or on mounds of rubble and is found in the Lake Eyre basin of South Australia.
