= Mount Toondina crater =

Impact crater in South Australia

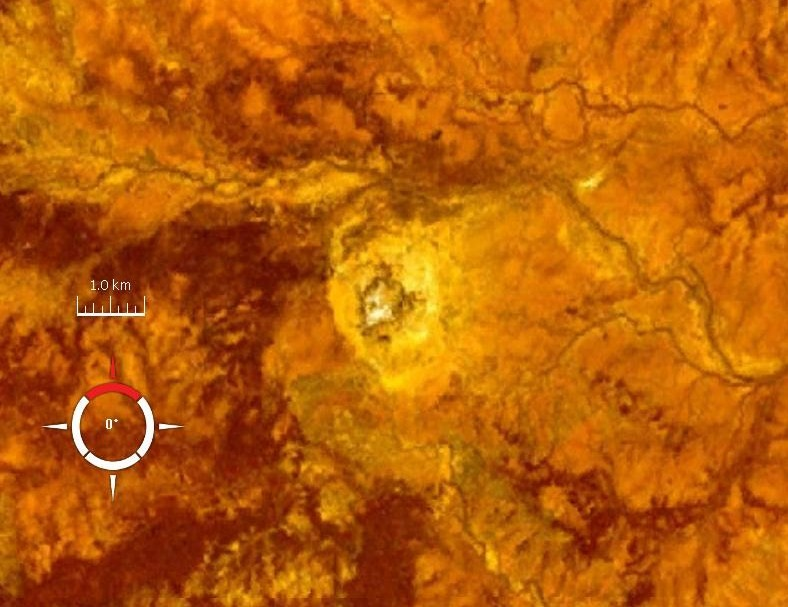
- Landsat image of Mount Toondina crater; screen capture from the NASA World Wind

- Location within South Australia
- Location: Eromanga Basin, Allandale Station, South Australia, Australia; 27°56′40″S 135°21′30″E

Impact crater structure
- Confidence: Confirmed
- Diameter: 4 km (2.5 mi)
- Rise: 114 m (374 ft)
- Age: <110 Ma <Early Cretaceous
- Exposed: Yes
- Drilled: No

Mount Toondina crater is an impact structure (or astrobleme), the eroded remnant of a former impact crater, located in northern South Australia in the locality of Allandale Station about 24 km (15 mi) south of the town of Oodnadatta. Mount Toondina is the high point of a circular topographic feature rising out of an otherwise relatively flat desert area of the Eromanga Basin. An impact origin was first suggested in 1976, challenging the earlier diapir (salt dome) hypothesis, and strongly supported by subsequent studies. A geophysical survey using gravity methods indicates an internal structure typical of complex impact craters, including an uplifted centre, and suggests that the original crater was about 3–4 km in diameter. The crater must be younger than the Early Cretaceous age of the rocks in which it is situated, but otherwise is not well dated. It has clearly undergone significant erosion since the impact event.
