= Allandale Station (pastoral lease) =

Pastoral lease in South Australia

Coordinates: 27°37′50″S 135°35′05″E

Location in South Australia

Annadale Station is a pastoral lease in the Australian state of South Australia located about 30 kilometres (19 mi) south-east of the town of Oodnadatta and which operates as a cattle station.

The land was first used for pastoral purposes in 1874 by J. and C.M. Bagot under pastoral lease no. 2422 while James Allan held this land under pastoral lease no 461 in 1896. Subsequent owners included the pastoralist George Bennet whose obituary published in 1928 described the station as "a compact, well-watered run about 3,000 square miles, practically surrounding the head of the Great Northern railway line."

In 2017, Allandale Station was reported as having an area of 500,000 hectares (1,200,000 acres) and supporting a herd of cross-bred cattle derived from Angus bulls and Hereford cows numbering between 1700 and 2500.

The land occupying the approximate extent of the Allandale Station pastoral lease was gazetted as a locality by the Government of South Australia on 26 April 2013 with the name of Allandale Station.

== See also ==
- List of ranches and stations
