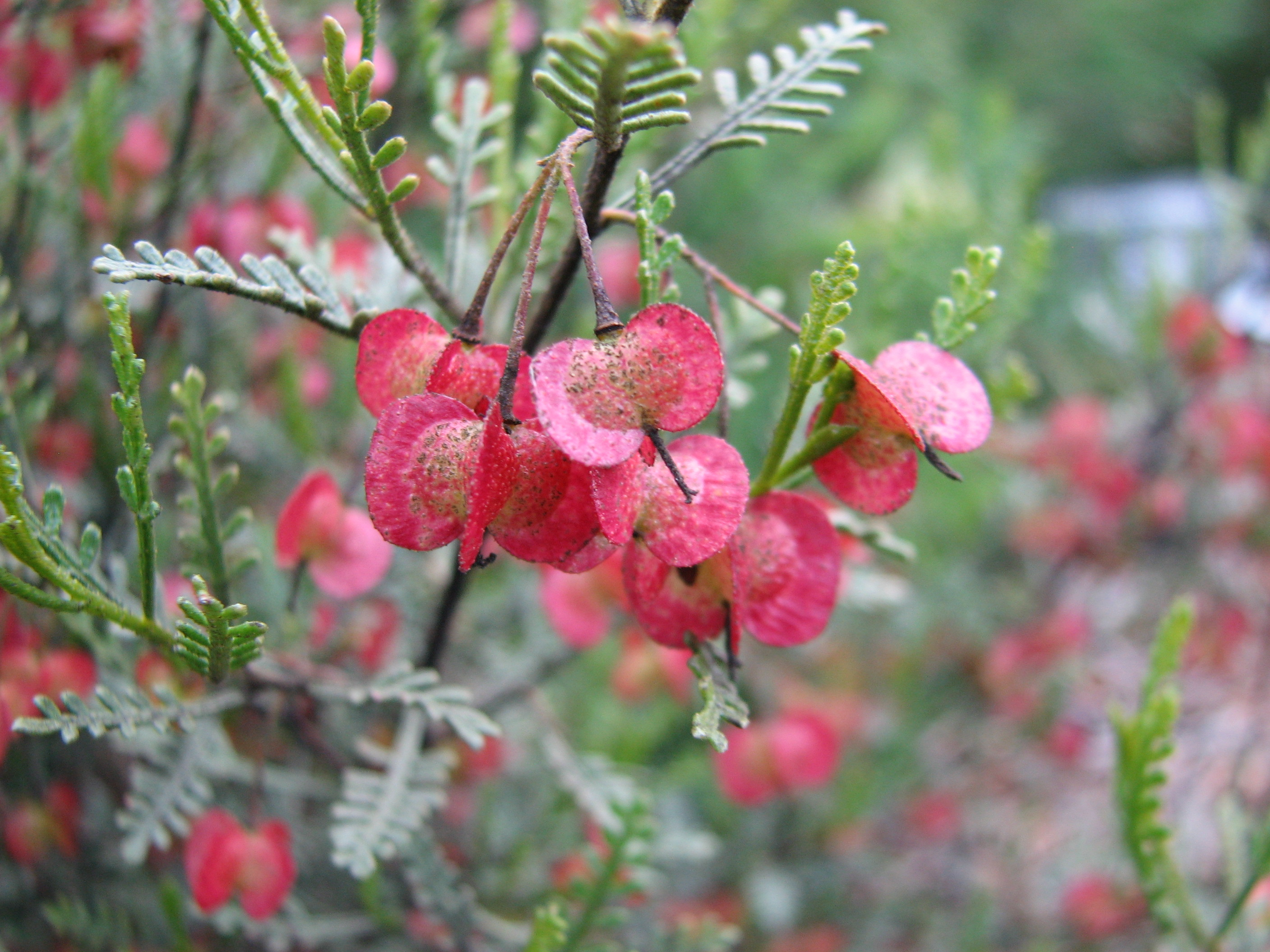
- In the Royal Botanic Gardens, Cranbourne

Scientific classification
- Kingdom: Plantae
- Clade: Tracheophytes
- Clade: Angiosperms
- Clade: Eudicots
- Clade: Rosids
- Order: Sapindales
- Family: Sapindaceae
- Genus: Dodonaea
- Species: D. microzyga

Binomial name
- Dodonaea microzyga F.Muell.
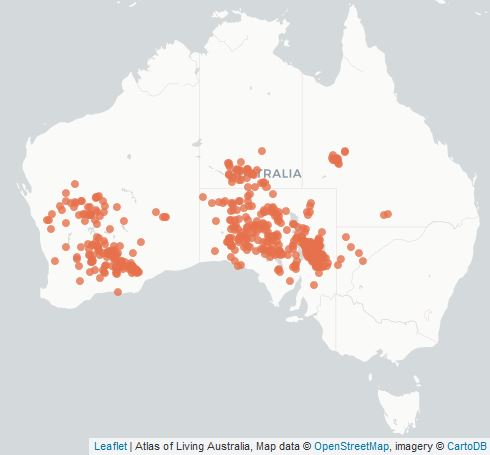
- Occurrence data from AVH

= Dodonaea microzyga =

Species of flowering shrub

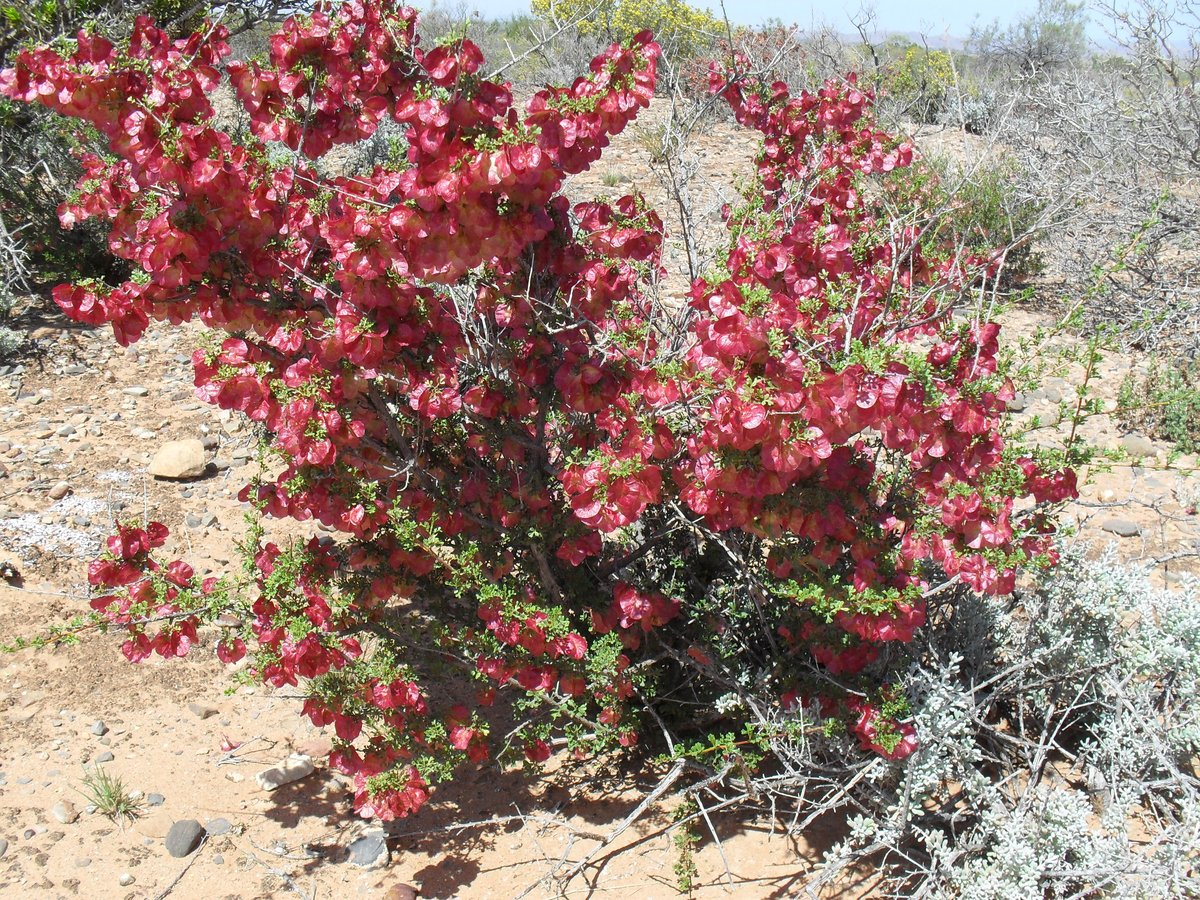
Habit

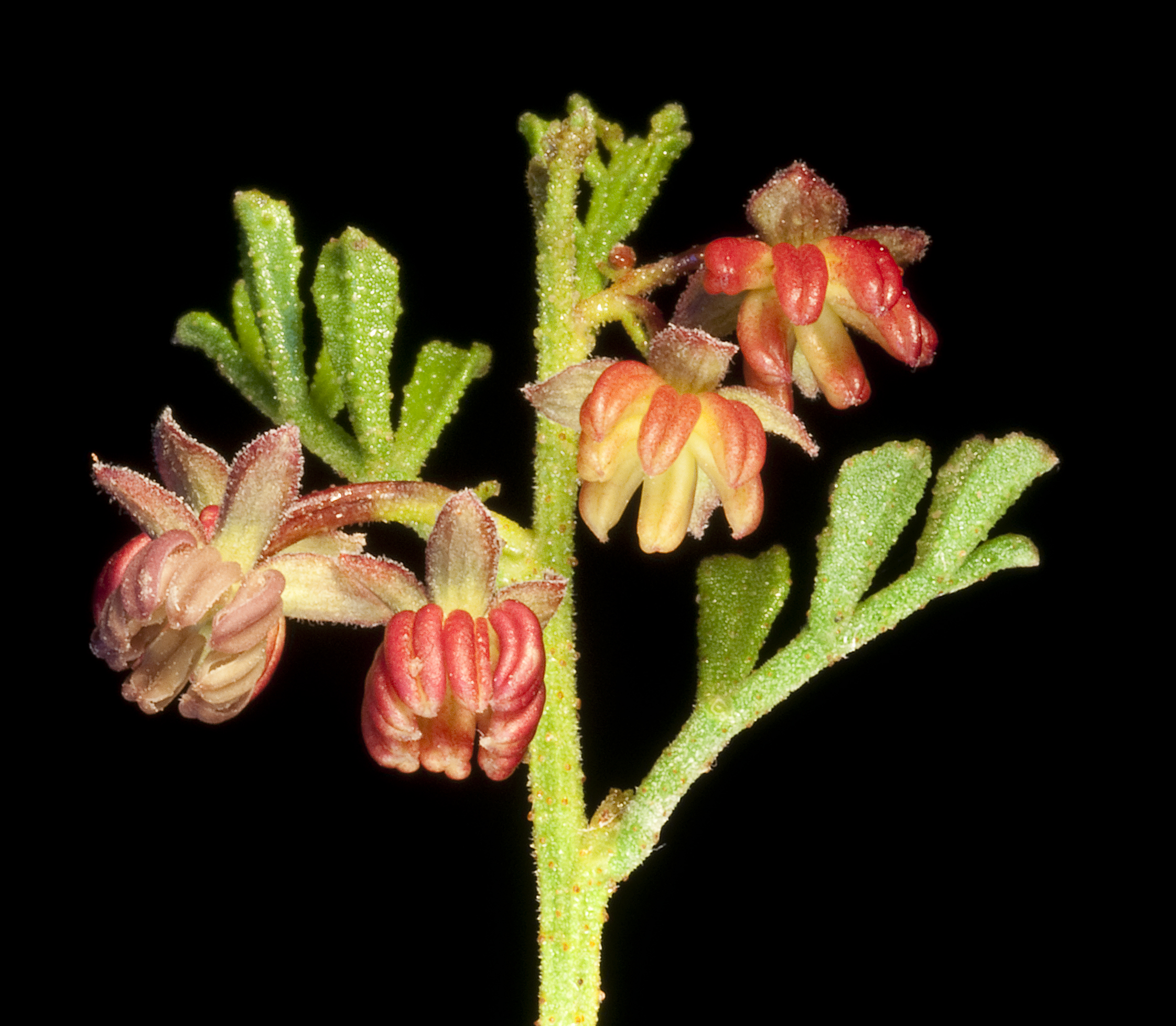
Flowers of var. acrolobata

Dodonaea microzyga, commonly known as brilliant hopbush, is a species of flowering plant in the family Sapindaceae and is endemic to Australia. It is a spreading, dioecious shrub with imparipinnate leaves with two to ten lance-shaped, egg-shaped or spoon-shaped leaflets, flowers arranged singly or in pairs usually with eight stamens, a hairy ovary, and capsules with 3 or 4 wings.

== Description ==
Dodonaea microzyga is a spreading, dioecious shrub that typically grows to a height of up to 0.5 m (1 ft 8 in). Its leaves are imparipinnate, 3–12 mm (0.12–0.47 in) long on a petiole 1.5–5 mm (0.059–0.197 in) long, with two to ten lance-shaped to broadly obovate leaflets 1.6–8 mm (0.063–0.315 in) long and 1–3 mm (0.039–0.118 in) wide. The leaflets have a rounded or toothed end and a wedge-shaped base, the end leaflet shorter and lobe-like. The flowers are arranged singly or in pairs, each flower on a pedicel 3.5–5 mm (0.14–0.20 in) long. The four sepals are egg-shaped, 18–2.6 mm (0.71–0.10 in) long but that fall off as the flowers develop. There are usually eight stamens and the ovary is covered with soft hairs. Flowering occurs from June to September and the fruit is an elliptic capsule 10–13.5 mm (0.39–0.53 in) long, 10–17.5 mm (0.39–0.69 in) wide and mostly glabrous with three, rarely four membranous wings 2.5–5 mm (0.098–0.197 in) wide.

== Taxonomy ==
Dodonaea microzyga was first formally described in 1863 by Ferdinand von Mueller based on plant material collected in the vicinity of Neales River in South Australia during an expedition of John McDouall Stuart. The description was published in Enumeration of the plants collected during Mr. K.Macd.Stuart's expeditions across the Australian continent in 1860, 1861 and 1862, published in the Victorian Parliamentary Papers. The specific epithet (microzyga) means 'a small cross-bar at the end of a pole' used to yoke two animals to a plough, referring to the small, pinnate leaves of this species.

In 1984, Judith Gay West described the variety acrolobata of D. microzyga in the journal Brunonia, and that name, and the name of the autonym are accepted by the Australian Plant Census:

- Dodonaea microzyga var. acrolobata J.G.West has leaves 6–12 mm (0.24–0.47 in) long, usually with 3 or 4 leaflets 3.5–8 mm (0.14–0.31 in) long and 1.5–3 mm (0.059–0.118 in) wide, the end leaflet shorter than the laterals.
- Dodonaea microzyga F.Muell. var. microzyga (the autonym) has leaves 3–9 mm (0.12–0.35 in) long, with 2 or 3 leaflets usually 1.6–3.5 mm (0.063–0.138 in) long and 1.0–3 mm (0.039–0.118 in) wide.

== Distribution and habitat ==
Dodonaea microzyga var. acrolobata is endemic to Western Australia where it grows between Meekatharra, Lake Grace Balladonia and the Great Victoria Desert on sandy soil on plains, breakaways and rocky rises in the Avon Wheatbelt, Coolgardie, Great Victoria Desert, Mallee, Murchison and Yalgoo bioregions. The variety microzyga grows in arid habitats in open shrubland or woodland in stony rises and outcrops in the far north-west of New South Wales, southern parts of the Northern Territory, western Queensland, and is widely distributed in South Australia.

== Conservation status ==
Dodonaea microzyga var. microzyga is listed as "endangered" in New South Wales under the Biodiversity Conservation Act 2016 but as of "least concern" under the Queensland Government Nature Conservation Act 1992.

== See also ==
List of Dodonaea species.
