= Allandale station =

Allandale station can refer to:

- Allandale railway station (Scotland), a proposed railway station that was left unbuilt in Allandale, Falkirk, Scotland
- Allandale Waterfront GO Station, an in-service commuter railway station in Barrie, Ontario, Canada
- Allandale railway station, New South Wales, a disused railway station in New South Wales, Australia
- Allandale Station, South Australia, a locality
- Allandale Station (pastoral lease), a cattle station in South Australia

== See also ==
- Allandale (disambiguation)
- Allendale railway station, England
- Allendale station (NJ Transit)
