= Allandale Station, South Australia =

Allandale Station
- Suburb
- Coordinates: 27°40′40″S 135°36′16″E
- Country: Australia
- State: South Australia
- Region: Far North
- LGA: Pastoral Unincorporated Area
- Location: 848 km (527 mi) N of Adelaide; 580 km (360 mi) N of Port Augusta; 20 km (12 mi) SE of Oodnadatta
- Established: 26 April 2013

Government
  - State electorate: Giles
  - Federal division: Grey
- Elevation (railway station): 73 m (240 ft)

Population
  - Total: 204 (shared with other localities) (2016 census) (Note: For the 2016 census, the State Suburb of Oodnadatta covered an area bounded by the Anangu Pitjantjatjara Yankunytjatjara lands in the west, the Northern Territory border in the north, the Munga-Thirri—Simpson Desert Conservation Park in the east and with its southern boundary aligning approximately with the northern end of Lake Eyre. The state suburb did not include the locality of Marla which it fully surrounded.)
- Time zone: UTC+9:30 (ACST)
  - Summer (DST): UTC+10:30 (ACST)
- Postcode: 5723
- Mean max temp: 29.1 °C (84.4 °F)
- Mean min temp: 14.6 °C (58.3 °F)
- Annual rainfall: 175.8 mm (6.92 in)
Suburbs around Allandale Station
Macumba	Macumba	Macumba
Todmorden; Oodnadatta; Todmorden; Arckaringa	Allandale Station	Macumba; Anna Creek
Nilpinna Station	Nilpinna Station	Anna Creek
- Locations; Adjoining localities

Allandale Station is a locality in the Australian state of South Australia located about 848 kilometres (527 mi) north of the state capital of Adelaide and about 20 kilometres (12 mi) south-east of the town of Oodnadatta.

Allandale Station's boundaries were created on 26 April 2013 and given the “local established name”. The term ‘Station’ was included in the name to distinguish it from the South Australian localities of Allendale East and Allendale North. Its boundaries align approximately with the Allandale Station pastoral lease.

The Oodnadatta Track passes through the locality entering in the south-east and exiting in the north-west near Oodnadatta while the Kemp Road, an unsealed road passes through the west side of the locality via Oodnadatta on its way to the Macumba homestead The Neales River flows from the west through the locality on its way to Lake Eyre in the east. Mount Toondina crater, an impact structure, is located in the locality's south-east.

Land use within the locality is ’primary production’ with the majority of the land being located in the Allandale Station pastoral lease. Allandale Station includes the Algebuckina Bridge, a disused railway bridge which spans the Neales River and which is listed on the South Australian Heritage Register.

The 2016 Australian census which was conducted in August 2016 reports that Allandale Station and other adjoining localities in the north of South Australia shared a population of 204 people of which at least 80 are estimated by the Outback Communities Authority to be living in the locality of Oodnadatta.

Allandale Station is located within the federal division of Grey, the state electoral district of Giles, the Pastoral Unincorporated Area of South Australia and the state government region of the Far North.

== Town of Algebuckina ==
Algebuckina (27°55′25″S 135°48′41″E) is a town proclaimed by the South Australian government in 1898 and is located on the east side of the locality adjoining the alignment of the former Central Australia Railway about 48 kilometres (30 mi) south-east of the town of Oodnadatta. Its site was surveyed in September 1890 in anticipation of the outcome of the discovery of gold in the adjoining area but was not proclaimed until 21 July 1898. The town was never developed and its site remains empty to the present day. The name which was originally used for the now-closed railway station located near the site of the town was derived from the Aboriginal name of a nearby water hole recorded by A. T. Woods in 1872.
