= Alan-a-Dale (disambiguation) =

Alan-a-Dale is a fictional outlaw associated with Robin Hood.

Alan-a-Dale may also refer to:

- Alan-a-Dale (horse), a Thoroughbred racehorse who won the 1902 Kentucky Derby
- "Alan A Dale" (Robin of Sherwood episode), an episode of the 1980s British television series Robin of Sherwood
- Alan-A-Dale, a cargo ship sunk during World War II

== See also ==
- Alan Dale (disambiguation)
