= Biber (submarine) =

Type of midget submarine

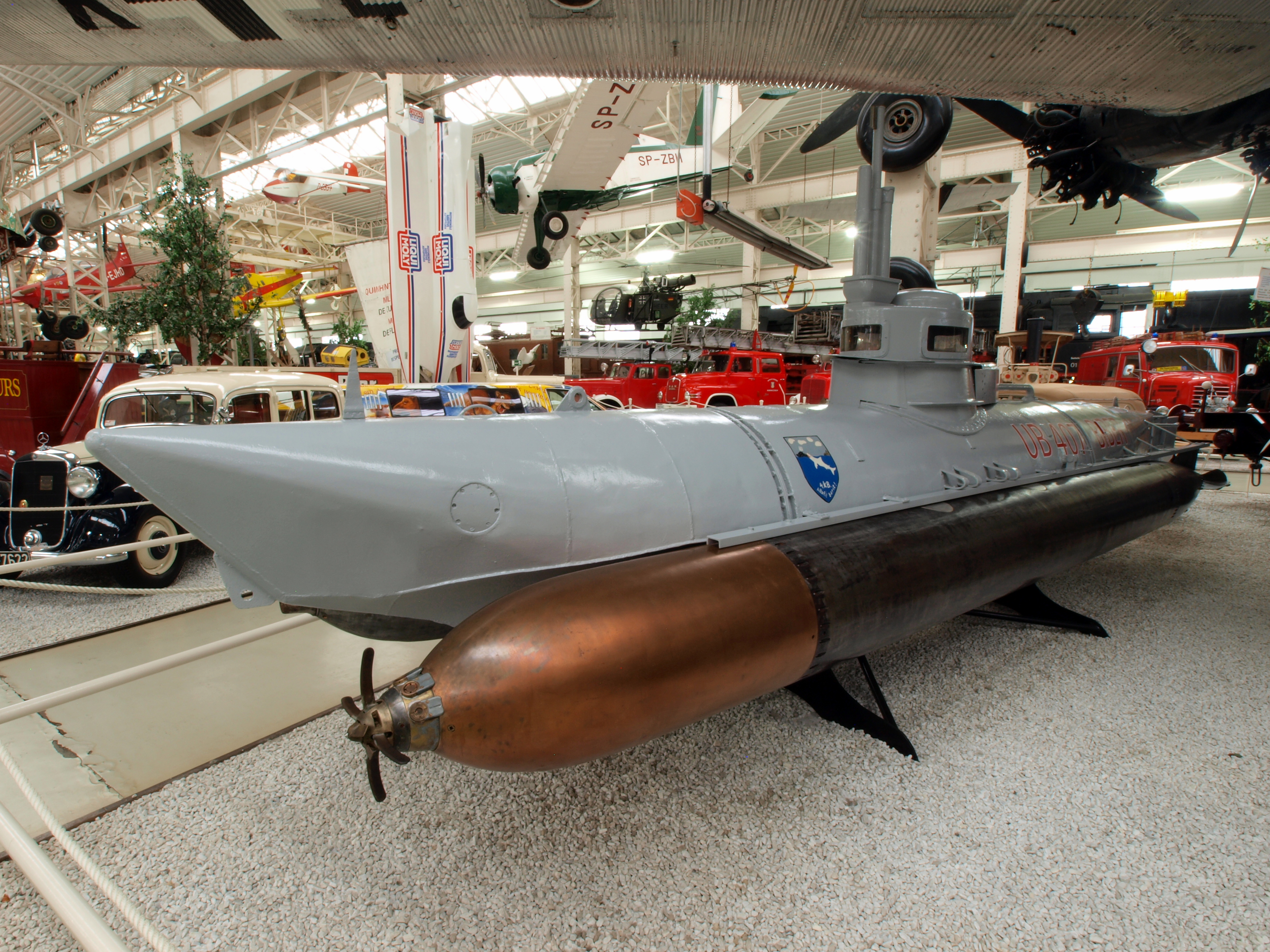
- Example on display at Technikmuseum Speyer, Germany

Class overview
- Name: Biber
- Builders: Flender Werke, Lübeck
- Operators: Kriegsmarine
- Completed: 324

General characteristics Biber
- Type: Midget submarine
- Displacement: 5.7 tonnes
- Length: 8.9 m (29 ft)
- Beam: 1.6 m (5 ft 3 in)
- Height: 1.6 m (5 ft 3 in)
- Propulsion: 32 hp (24 kW) Otto petrol engine, 13 hp (9.7 kW) electric motor,
- Speed: 6.5 knots (12.0 km/h) surfaced; 5.3 knots (9.8 km/h) submerged
- Range: 100 nautical miles (surfaced)
- Test depth: 20 m maximum
- Crew: 1
- Armament: Two G7e (TIIIc) torpedoes or two Torpedomine Typ B (TMB)

Biber (German pronunciation: [ˈbiːbɐ]; German for "beaver") was a German midget submarine of the Second World War. Armed with two externally mounted 53-centimetre (21 in) torpedoes or mines, they were intended to attack coastal shipping. They were among the smallest submarines in the Kriegsmarine.

The Biber was hastily developed to help meet the threat of an Allied invasion of Europe. This resulted in basic technical flaws that, combined with the inadequate training of their operators, meant they never posed a real threat to Allied shipping, despite 324 submarines being delivered. One of the class's few successes was the sinking of the cargo ship Alan-A-Dale.

Several survive in museums, including one in operational condition.

== Development ==
Originally proposed by Kapitänleutnant Bartels in 1942, but not acted on until the need for coastal defence in the event of an invasion became paramount. Construction of the first prototype began in February 1944, at the Flender shipyard in Lübeck, and was completed in less than 6 weeks. The initial prototype, officially titled Bunteboot (but better known as Adam), was heavily influenced by the British Welman submarine. It differed from the final design in a number of respects such as being nearly 2 m (6 ft 7 in) shorter. Following testing on the Trave river on 29 May twenty four Bibers were ordered.

== Design ==
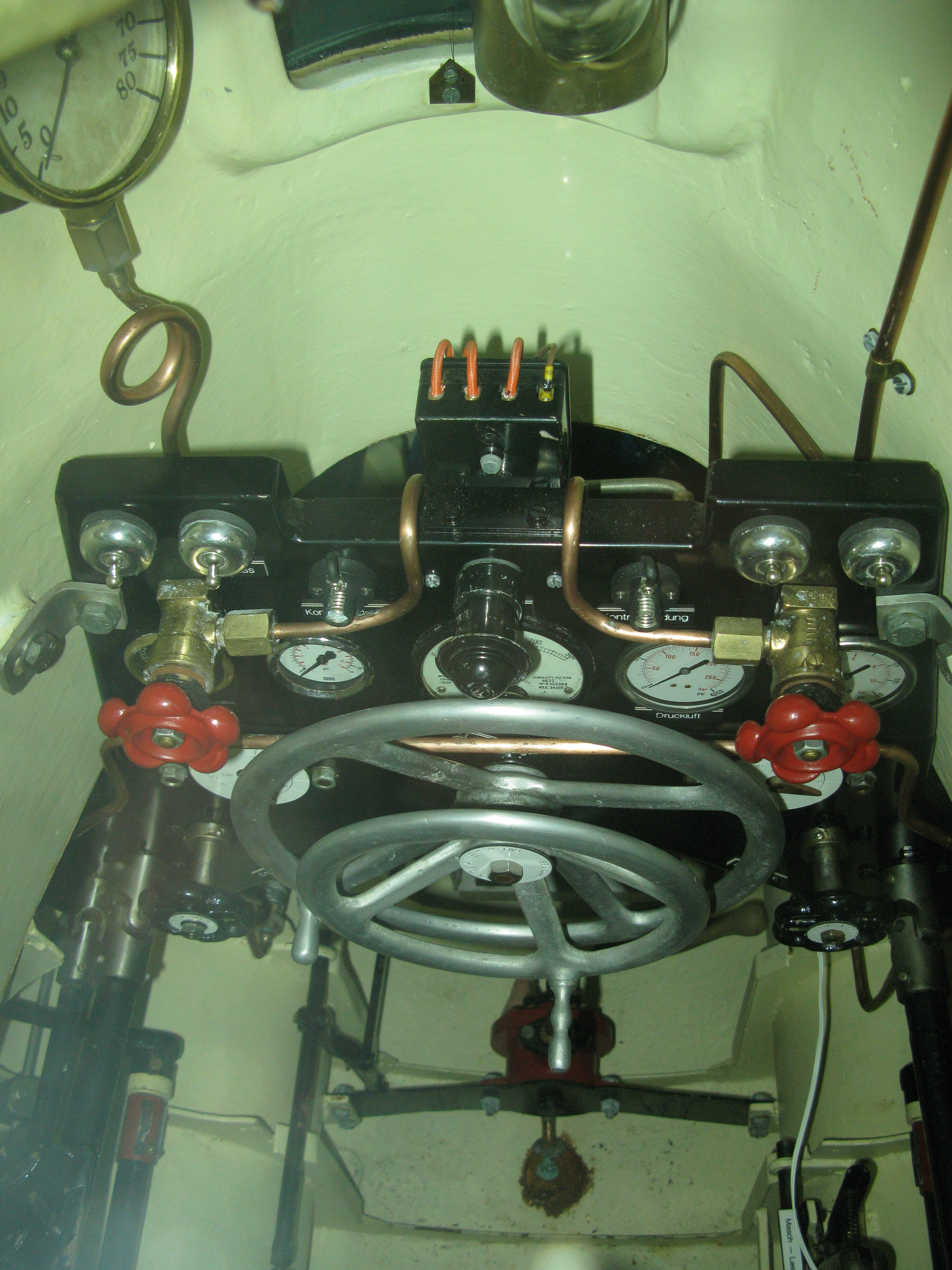
The instruments and controls of a Biber submarine

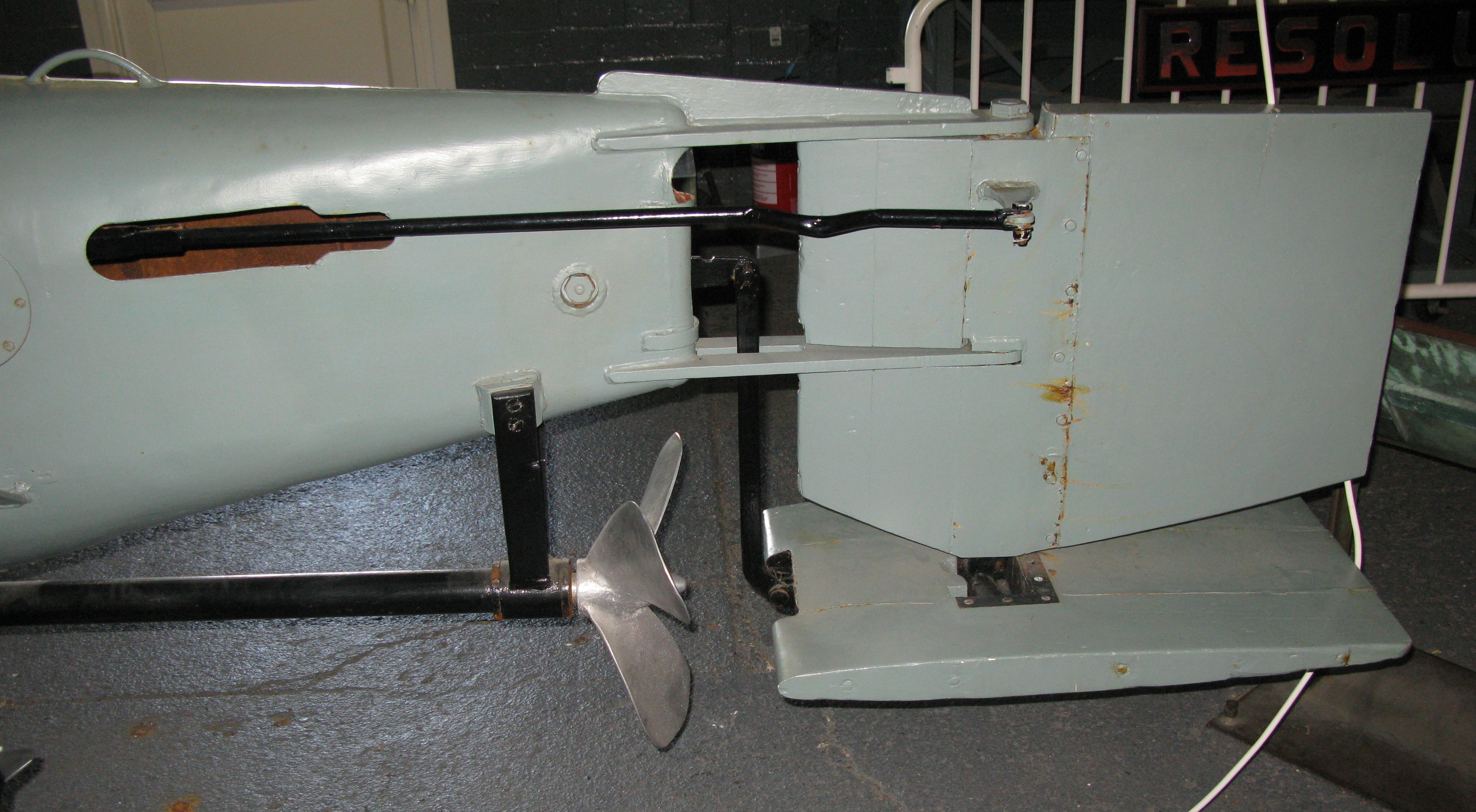
The propeller and wooden control surfaces

The hull was built in three sections composed of 3 millimetres (0.12 in) thick steel with an aluminium alloy conning tower bolted to the top. The conning tower contained armoured glass windows to allow the pilot to see out. The hydroplanes and rudder were made of wood and trying to control them while tracking the depth gauge, compass and periscope made the craft hard to handle. Adding to the pilot's difficulties, the craft lacked compensating and trimming tanks, making staying at periscope depth a near impossibility. The Biber had two diving tanks, one in the bow section and one in the stern.

The submarine could be armed with either two TIIIc torpedoes with neutral buoyancy (achieved by limiting the number of batteries on board), mines, or a mixture of the two. The torpedoes or mines were accommodated in semi-circular recesses in the side of the hull. These reduced the overall width of the loaded craft, making land transport easier and also reduced drag in the water, but at the cost of weakening the hull.

The Biber was powered on the surface by a 32 hp (24 kW) Otto Blitz petrol engine, which was used despite concerns about the risks posed by the carbon monoxide the engine gave off. The engine had the advantage of being cheap and available in large numbers. Propulsion while submerged was provided by a 13 horsepower (9.7 kW) electric motor, supplied by three Type T13 T210 battery troughs.

== Operation ==
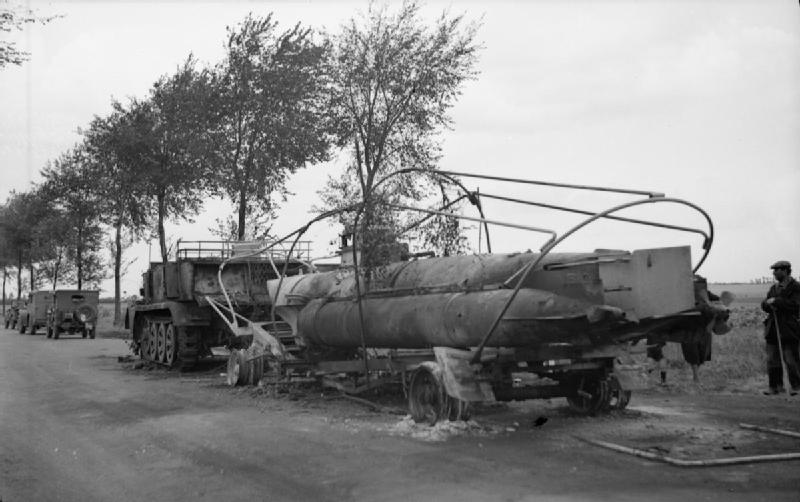
A Biber captured by the British Army near Arras, France, after being abandoned by the retreating Germans (1944)

Biber operations were carried out under the auspices of the K-Verband, a German naval unit which operated a mixture of midget submarines and explosive speedboats. The training of Biber operators was originally planned to take eight weeks, but the initial group of pilots was rushed through in just three weeks. Planning also called for flotillas of 30 boats and pilots with just under 200 shore support crew.

Operations generally lasted from one to two days with pilots either using a drug known as D-IX to stay awake on longer missions or caffeine-laced chocolate. The poor quality of the Biber's periscope meant that night attacks had to be carried out on the surface.

=== Fécamp harbour ===
The first Biber operation was launched on 30 August 1944 from Fécamp harbour. Twenty-two boats were launched but only fourteen were able to leave the harbour and of those fourteen only two managed to reach their operational area. They sank two transports, one a Liberty ship. The Bibers were then withdrawn to Mönchengladbach.

=== Operations in the Scheldt Estuary ===
In December 1944 it was decided to deploy Bibers against traffic to Antwerp in the Scheldt Estuary. The force was based at Rotterdam with forward bases at Poortershaven and Hellevoetsluis. The first attack took place on the night of the 22/23 of December. Eighteen Biber were involved of which only one returned. The only allied loss caused by the operation was Alan-A-Dale. Further operations between the 23rd and the 25th achieved no success and none of the 14 submarines deployed survived. On the 27th the accidental release of a torpedo in the Voorneschen resulted in the sinking of 11 Bibers (although they were later recovered). The three undamaged Bibers later sailed again; none returned. An operation on the night 29/30 January resulted in damage to (much of it due to ice) or loss of most of the remaining Bibers. Losses combined with RAF bombing prevented attacks from being mounted in February 1945. The bombing had damaged the cranes used to move the Bibers into and out of the water. Reinforcements allowed operations to continue until April 1945 but no successes were achieved and the Biber flotillas continued to take a very high rate of losses. The last Biber mission was an attempt at mine laying and took place on the night of 26 April. Of the four Bibers that took part, one ran aground and three were attacked by Thunderbolts, which sank two of them.

=== Attempted attack on Vaenga Bay ===
In January 1945 an attempt was made to mount an attack on Vaenga Bay in the Kola Inlet. The hope was either to attack one of the convoys that stopped there to refuel and take on ammunition or to attack the Soviet battleship Arkhangelsk (HMS Royal Sovereign on loan to the USSR). As it happened neither the battleship nor a convoy were in the port at the time of the planned attack. The plan was for U-boats to carry the Bibers within range of the harbour. U-295, U-318 and U-716 set off from Harstad on 5 January with Bibers mounted on their casings. Vibrations from the U-boats’ engines caused the Bibers stern glands to leak allowing water to reach the machinery space and as a result the mission was abandoned.

=== Attack on Nijmegen road bridge ===
On 12 January 1945 Biber submarines were used in a night attack on the road bridge across the River Waal at Nijmegen. The attack first involved releasing 240 mines into the river to clear defensive netting. The Bibers then attacked in two waves. The first was a group of 20 that fired their torpedoes at the bridge. The second was a group of 4 towing explosive charges. The attack was unsuccessful at least in part due to the level of allied artillery fire.

== Further developments ==
Planning for two man versions (Biber II and Biber III) began but never got off the drawing board.

== Surviving examples ==
There are 22 known surviving Biber midget submarines around the world, including:

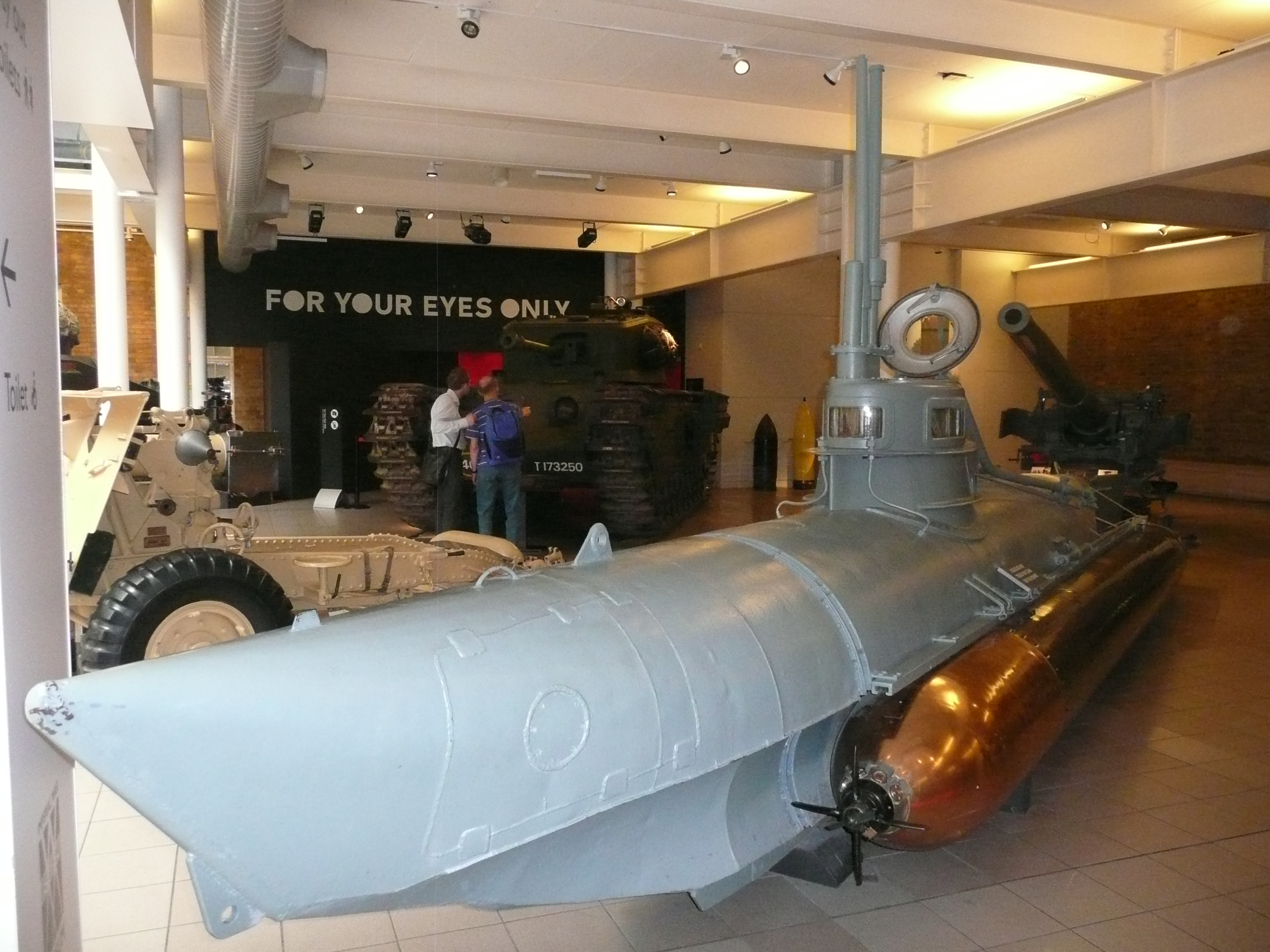
Biber No. 90 on display at the Imperial War Museum (2008)

- Biber No. 90

This craft was displayed at the Imperial War Museum, London. Currently displayed at IWM Duxford. It was one of three Bibers launched from the canal at Hellevoetsluis in late December 1944. It was found sinking 49 miles (79 km) NE of Dover on 29 December 1944, its crewman had failed to properly close the engine exhaust system and died from resultant carbon monoxide poisoning. The minesweeper HMS Ready took it in tow and, even when it sank close to Dover harbour entrance, the Royal Navy still raised it and subjected it to extensive trials. One oddity discovered during the initial search of the boat was:

a bottle hidden under the seat and inside was a document in English, which, romantic as it read, appeared to have some bearing upon the capture of the submarine, and possibly the explanation of why the pilot met his end.

That is all that the report says about that finding; any further details appear to have been lost.
The pilot of the Biber was later identified as Joachim Langsdorff, who was the son of Captain Hans Langsdorff of the Admiral Graf Spee.
The craft was given to the Imperial War Museum 3 April 1946.

- Biber No. 105

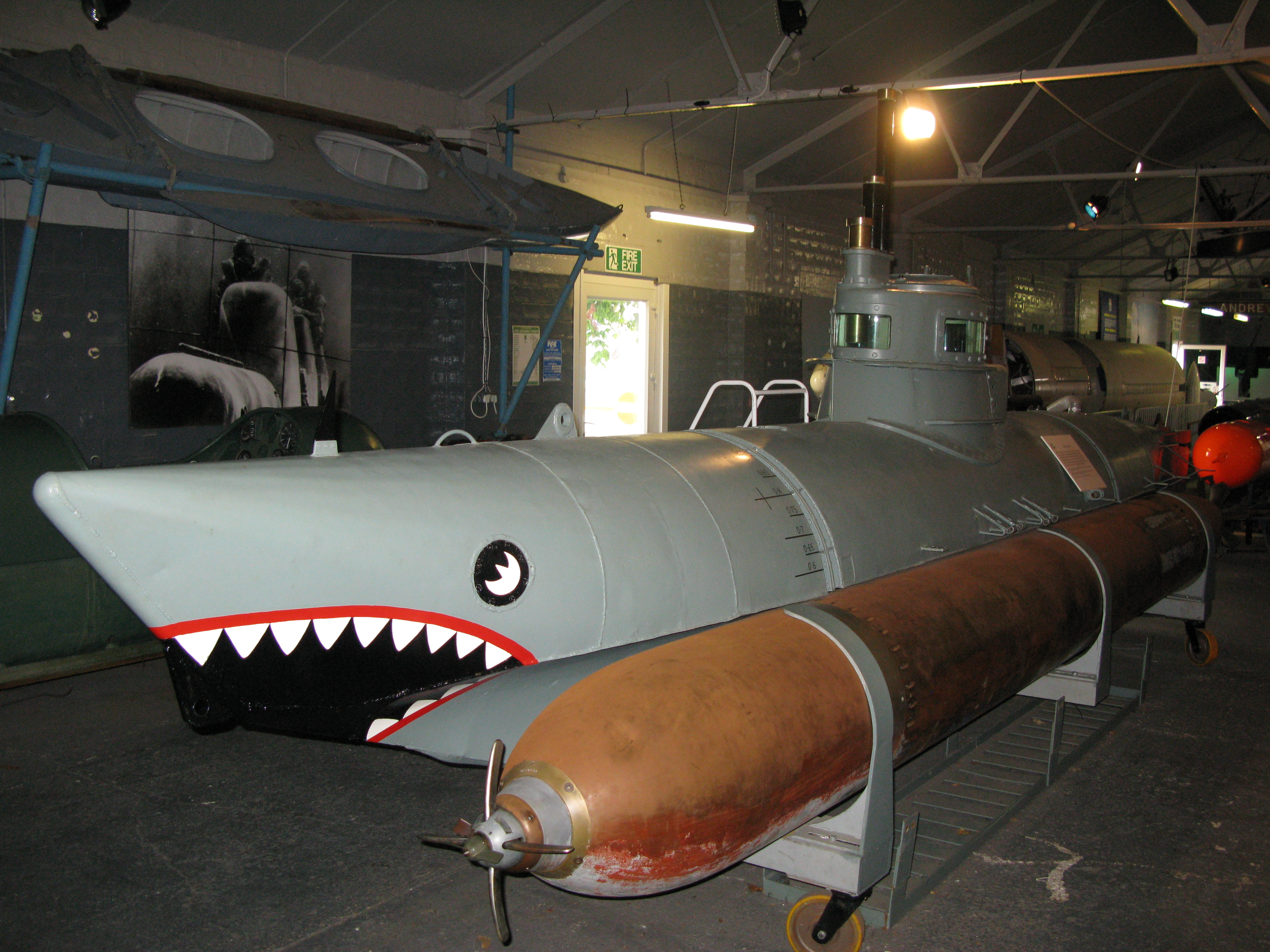
Submarine No. 105 with a torpedo mounted at the Royal Navy Submarine Museum.

This Biber held by the Royal Navy Submarine Museum, Gosport. It is in a working condition and believed to be the only fully operational World War 2 submarine in existence. The submarine was restored to working condition by apprentices from Fleet Support Limited on a sandwich course in 2003 under the guidance of Ian Clark. The restoration featured in the third series of Channel 4's television programme, Salvage Squad, during which the craft was successfully test-dived in a flooded dry dock.

- Biber at the Fort aan den Hoek van Holland Hook of Holland

This example was discovered in 1990 during dredging operations in the Nieuwe Waterweg, in the Netherlands. It has since been restored.

Three more Bibers can be seen in the Netherlands; one in Vlissingen, at Fort Rammekens, and another at the Overloon War Museum. The third Biber is privately owned and displayed outdoors at the entrance to Siegerpark in Amsterdam, it has been painted red and white and serves as an advertising sign.

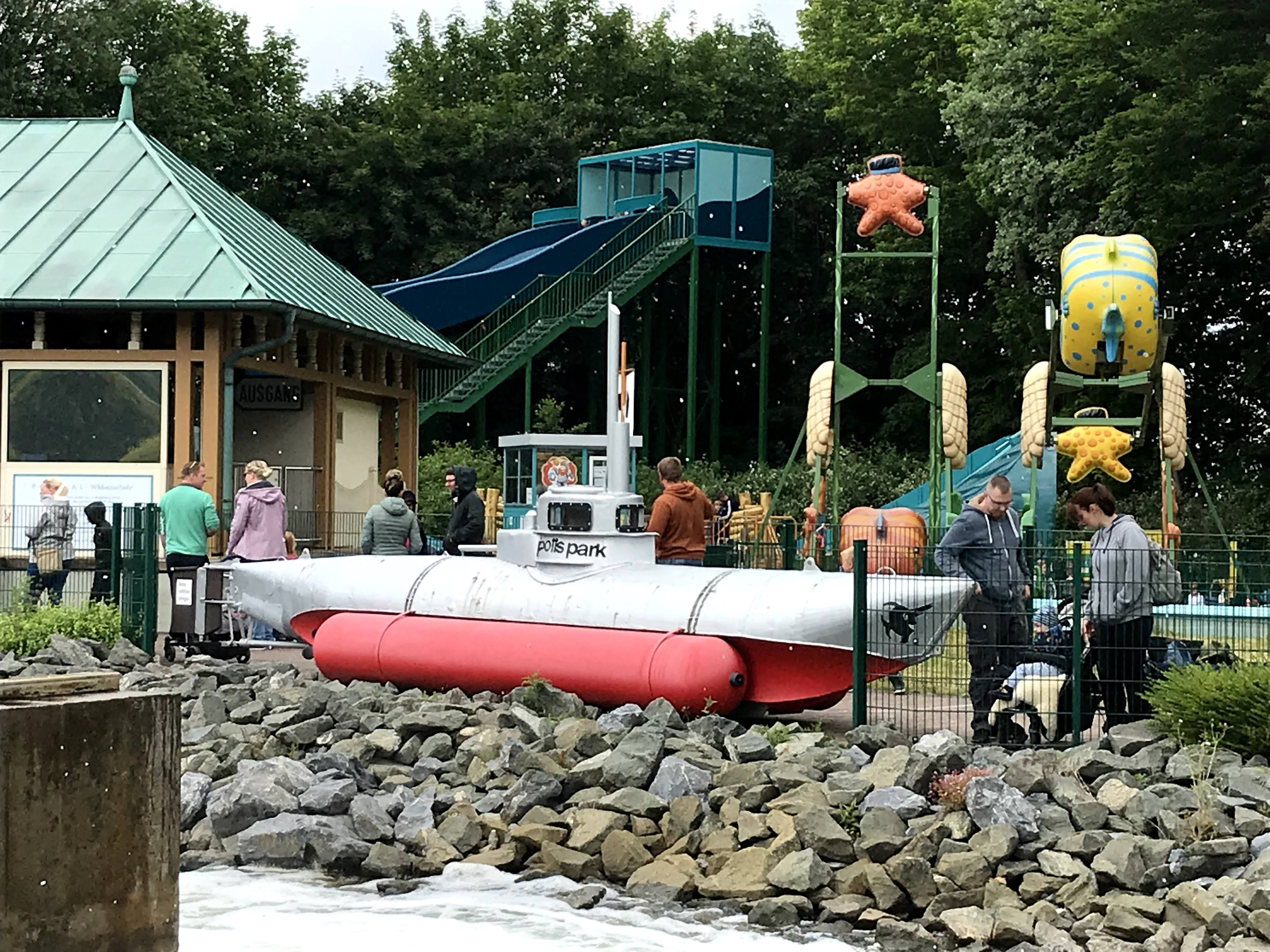
A preserved Biber at Potts Park, Minden, Germany.

Other Bibers are displayed at the Deutsches Museum in Munich, the Technikmuseum Speyer in Speyer and the Rheinmuseum in Emmerich am Rhein, Germany.

About 130 Bibers were left in Norway at the time of the German surrender. Today, 5 of these are kept in original or restored condition at various museums: One at the Royal Norwegian Navy Museum, one at the Haakonsvern naval base, one at Kvalvik coastal fortress outside Kristiansund, one at Tellevik coastal fortress outside Bergen and one at Søgne vicary outside Søgne.

Other examples are displayed at the Blockhaus d'Éperlecques in Northern France, and at the Potts Park amusement park in Minden, Germany.
