= George Bennet (pastoralist) =

Australian pastoralist and racehorse owner

George Bennet (1870 – 16 May 1928) was a pastoralist and racehorse owner in South Australia.

== History ==
Bennet was born in Victor Harbor, the elder son of George Bennet and his wife Emily Bennet, née Dyke. At age 18 he and his younger brother Albert Francis Bennet (born 1874) accompanied their father to Macumba Station, where he had taken a position of manager. The father and brother died of unexplained causes during hot weather at Macumba Station on 8 December 1888.

Bennet continued working with cattle, and around 1898 began breeding Hereford stud cattle, and he won numerous prizes with bulls exhibited in Victoria and South Australia. He also bred Shorthorn bulls.In 1900 was left the Cecilia Creek run by James Allen, a former employee.

At one time he owned Allandale Station, of 3,000 square miles (7,800 km^{2}), whose homestead is approximately 12 miles (20 km) from Oodnadatta. Allandale was later linked with Crown Point and Bond Springs stations as the Crown Pastoral Company, which was subsequently taken over by Sir Sidney Kidman. Later the Crown Point and Bond Springs Stations were joined with Allandale under the name of the Crown Pastoral Company, which was subsequently taken over by Sir Sidney Kidman.

Bennet purchased Tempe Downs about 1917, but lived at Allan Park, Edwardstown.

== Racing ==
He not only bred horses for the turf, but imported several from Britain, including Lord Marco and Sir Marco. Noted horses include Homer, Scintillation, Radiant, Friar Perfect. Admirable Bob, Goodwood, Miss Neckersgat, Step Out, Lord Marco, and Sir Marco. Latterly he had raced Phaedo and Apollo. His extensive stables and training track at Edwardstown, which he named Allan Park, was previously owned by Seth Ferry.

Notable successes include:

- Tattersalls Cup in 1910, with Goodwood
- A.R.C. City Handicap in 1914, with Friar Perfect
- Port Adelaide Cup on 26 December 1916, with Admirable Bob, trained by his brother-in-law Ike Reid
- Birdwood Cup at Williamstown on 26 January 1920, with Colbert, trained by M. Carmody
- Adelaide Cup on 9 May 1921, with Sir Marco, trained by R. S. Burgess

== Death ==
He left his station Tempe Downs with other cattlemen, droving cattle destined for the Adelaide abattoirs, when he collapsed and died. He was buried at Horseshoe Bend, approximately 200 miles (320 km) north of Oodnadatta.

== Family ==
George Bennet married Margaret Josephine Hennessy ( – ) in 1901. Their children included:

- (Emily) Dorothy Bennet (1903–1985)
- Allan George Bennet (1906–1983)
- Albert Bennet (1909–1976)
- Margaret Bennet (1907– )

He had sisters Emily Bennet (1868–1871), Eva Bennet (1877– ) and Gertie Bennet (1885– ) and brothers Albert Francis Bennet (1874–1888) and Arthur Bennet (1882– )
