= Algebuckina Bridge =

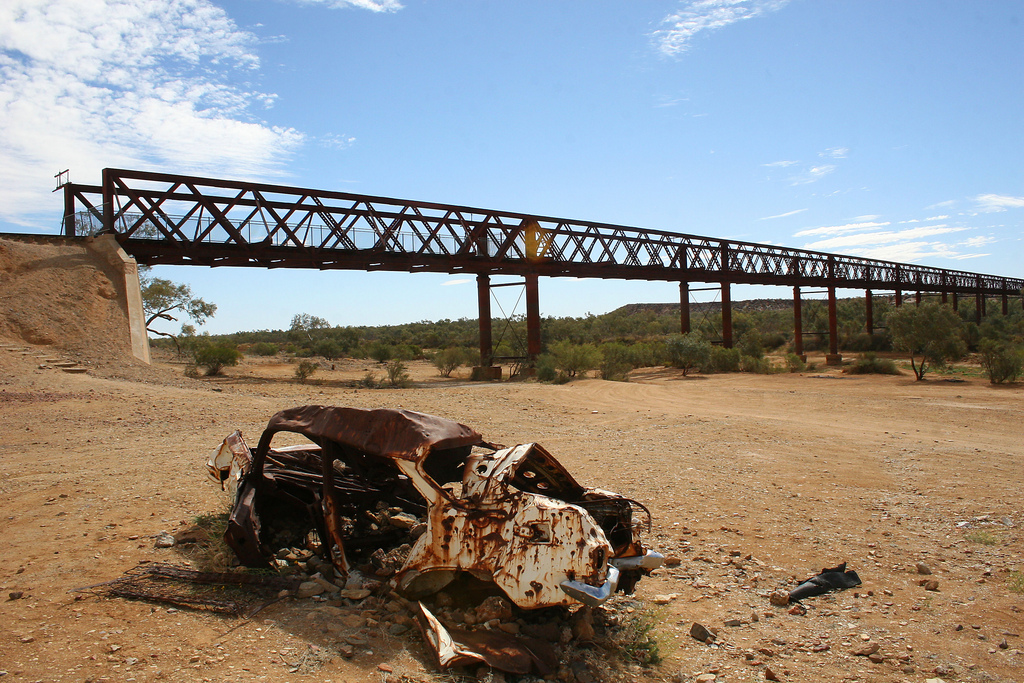
- The bridge in 2009
- Coordinates: 27.8993°S 135.8075°E
- Carries: Railway (disused)
- Crosses: Neales River
- Locale: Allandale Station, South Australia
- Heritage status: Register of the National Estate; South Australian Heritage Register

Characteristics
- Material: Wrought iron
- Total length: 587 metres (1,927 ft)
- No. of spans: 19

History
- Construction cost: £AU 60,000
- Opened: 8 January 1892
- Closed: 1981
- Replaces: Surface level crossing

Location
- Interactive map of Algebuckina Bridge

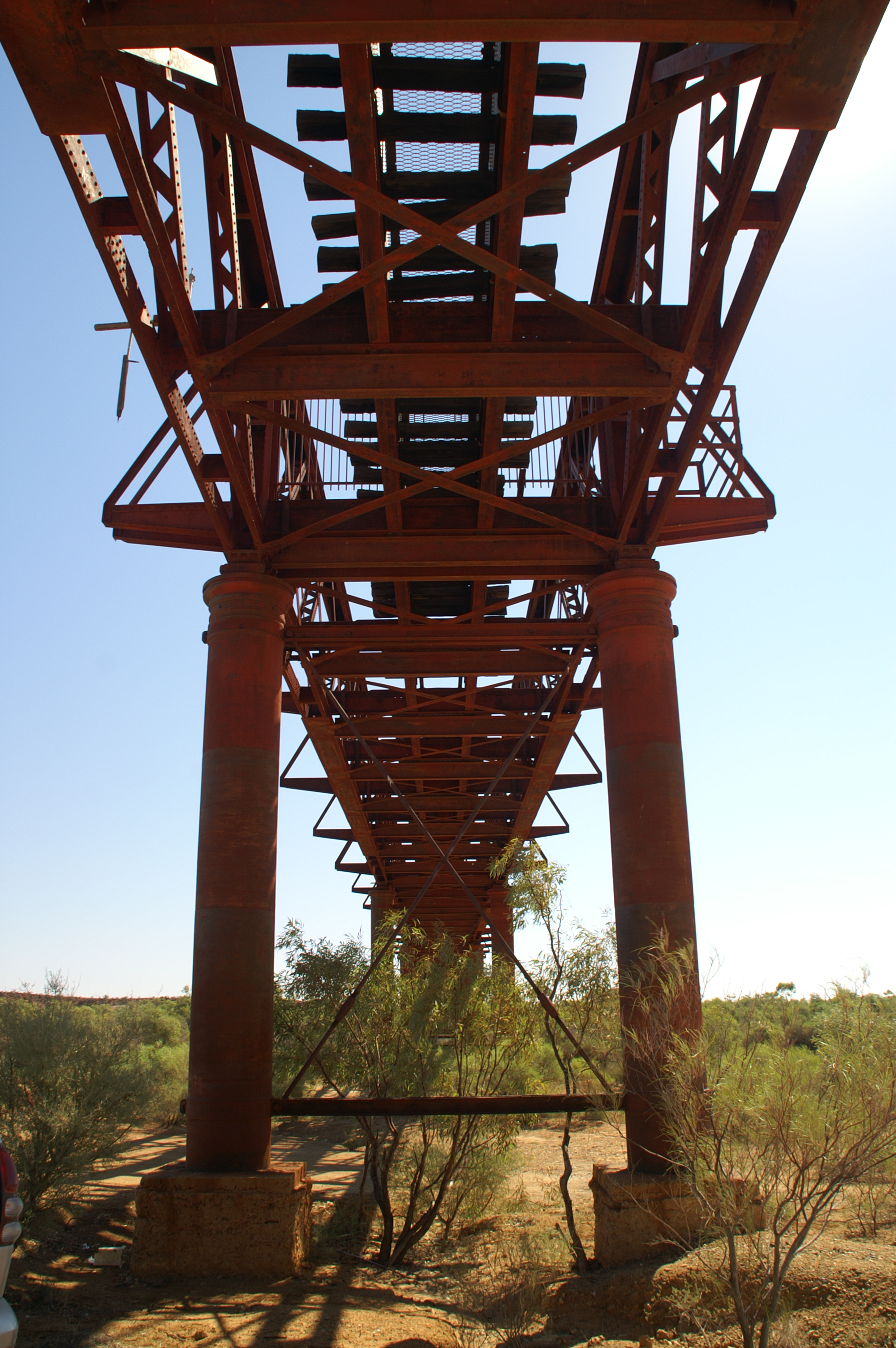
The bridge from below

The Algebuckina Bridge is a Victorian era railway bridge in the Australian state of South Australia located about 55 kilometres (34 mi) south-east of the town of Oodnadatta in the locality of Allandale Station on the route of the now-closed Central Australia Railway. It opened in January 1892. It was the longest bridge in South Australia until construction of the Seaford suburban rail line across the Onkaparinga River south of Adelaide in 2014.

The 1,927 feet (587 m) bridge consists of 19 spans of 100 feet (30 m) length and which are of lattice wrought iron construction, sitting on cast iron cylindrical piers. It was strengthened in 1926 to allow it to carry heavier trains.

It was built by a team of around 350 men, working in extreme desert heat. Several graves are nearby, and one of them is for David Saunders, who died in January 1890 from “heart disease accelerated by heat apoplexy.”

The bridge crosses the floodplain of the Neales River, which is prone to seasonal flooding, and replaced a surface-level railway which was frequently washed away. After a severe flood in 1974, which almost reached the bridge decks, the line was closed in 1981 and a new route built 100 miles further west.

The bridge was listed on the now-defunct Register of the National Estate on 28 September 1982 and listed as a state heritage place on the South Australian Heritage Register on 20 November 1986.
