= Macumba Station =

Pastoral lease in South Australia

Coordinates: 27.25082°S 135.6533°E

Location in South Australia

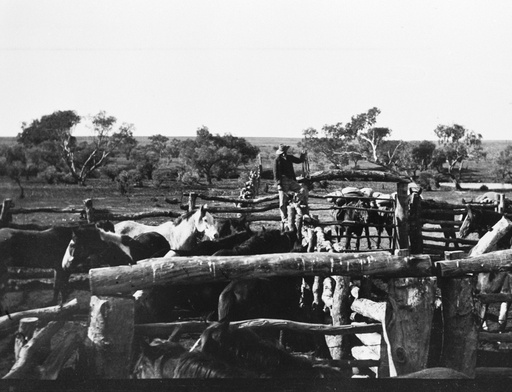
Stock pens at Macumba

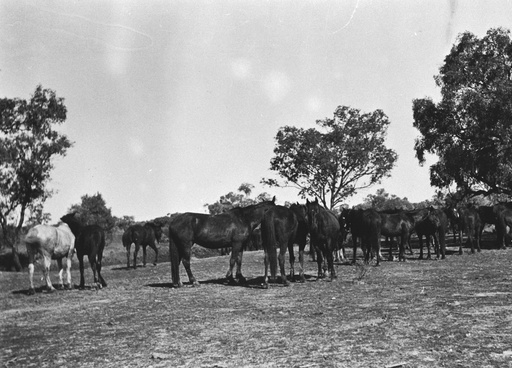
Macumba horses

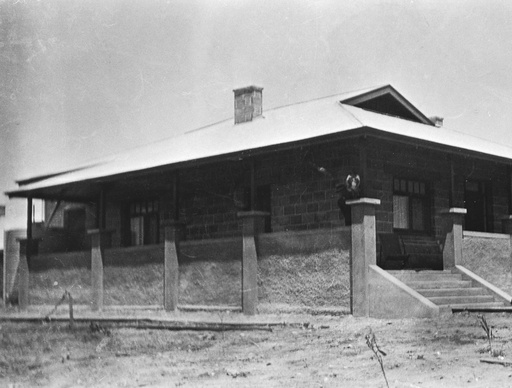
Macumba homestead

Macumba Station, often just called Macumba, is a pastoral lease in South Australia currently operating as a cattle station.

== Description ==
Macumba is located about 39 kilometres (24 mi) north east of Oodnadatta and 201 kilometres (125 mi) east of Marla in the state of South Australia,

The station occupies an area of 11,063 square kilometres (4,271 sq mi) and is the third largest station in South Australia after Anna Creek station and Innamincka Station. Macumba was owned by the pastoral company S. Kidman & Co. until 2016, when a deal was finalised for its purchase by joint venture company, Australian Outback Beef. The company is owned by Gina Reinhart (who holds a 2/3 stake) a China's Shanghai CRED (which holds the remaining 1/3).

The station contains a range of terrains including sandhills, mulga woodland, watercourses with redgums and areas of desert and gibber plain. Watercourses crossing the property include the Macumba River, Stevenson Creek and Alberga Creek, each having several waterholes some of which are almost permanent, except in times of prolonged drought. Willow Bore, which was sunk by the government prior to 1892, can provide 20,000 imperial gallons (90,922 L) per day, enough to support 2,000 head of cattle.

== History ==
Established prior to 1883 the station at that time was owned by Young and Belt. In 1883 the surrounding area had been flooded and all the waterholes and creeks were filled.

A man named Millard became lost in the desert country of the station in 1884, and on finding the telegraph line he burned down a pole and cut the wire to draw attention to his plight. The transcontinental telegraph line was out of service for several days and Millard's body along with the bodies of both his horses were found when repair crews reached the breakage.

In 1887 the station was owned by Messrs Chambers and Polhill who operated a store and ran a mail service out to Peake and surrounding areas as far as Alice Springs. The area had been flooded in the recent past as the old Macumba Station had been abandoned in consequence of the frequent floods.

The station was managed by Joseph Albert Breaden in the late 1880s and early 1890s but he left to join Carr Boyd in his expedition from Warrina to Western Australia.

In the December 1888 George Bennet, who was acting as station manager, and his second son Albert Francis Bennet (1874–1888) died at the station while working with a mob of cattle in extremely hot weather, though the circumstances remained something of a mystery. His elder son, also named George Bennet (1870–1928), was later well-known as a pastoralist and racehorse owner.

Alexander W. T. Grant-Thorold and Henry L'Estrange, trading as "Grant & Stokes" acquired the property previous to 1889 when they took delivery of 500 bullocks for the station and then sold off 1,000 in 1890, followed by another 2,500 in 1891.

Cattle stealing was a problem at Macumba in 1891 with two cases being heard in court. George Bishop, Arthur Hutchinson and Thomas Bennett were all charged with stealing and although Bennett was acquitted the other two were found guilty and sentenced to two years hard labour. Another man, Job Hobbs, was also charged with stealing cattle from Macumba.

The partnership Grant & Stokes was dissolved in 1893 and Macumba was sold to John Waterstion, who also bought the two other properties owned by the pair, Glen Helen and Idracowra along with the 15,000 cattle stocked on the properties. All the properties had been in the grip of a prolonged drought from 1892–1893 and it was estimated that Macumba alone had lost 1,000 head of cattle from thirst when all the waterholes and creeks had dried up.

The property was flooded in 1903 when the Stevenson Creek rose suddenly following heavy rain upstream. Members of a prospecting syndicate were stranded for four days waiting to cross the creek when the waters started to subside.

W. R. Cave took over at Macumba prior to 1905 and sold 40 bullocks at market in May of that year. The station manager at the time was Mr Smart.

Sidney Kidman acquired Macumba in 1905, most likely in September, and he started moving horses off the property to Warrina then trucked them to the Kapunda horse sales. Kidman visited the property in December 1905 for an inspection with his partner, Mr Bartlett, finding the run to be in splendid condition.

In 1908 massive floods caused a huge tract of land 40 miles (64 km) long and the same width including parts of Macumba and neighbouring Dalhousie Station to be submerged following heavy rains in the area. Nearby Todmorden Station recorded a fall of 6.5 inches (165 mm) in a 24-hour period.

When a second bore was sunk at the station in 1909, a good supply of artesian water was struck at a depth of 650 feet (198 m) giving a supply of 320,000 imperial gallons (1,454,749 L) per day. By 1917 a fifth bore was being planned and Macumba was considered one of the best watered runs in the north.

The area suffered a time of drought for a period of three years from 1928–1931 when the rains finally came. In 1931 there were few cattle left in the district, but there were also few vermin such as rabbits and wild dogs remaining either. After more good follow-up rains the summer was still very hot in 1932 with an average temperature of 111 °F (44 °C) being recorded for 50 days.

Severe floods swept through much of Central Australia in early 1939. The pigsty bridge (a temporary bridge supported on piers consisting of sleepers built in sections of four) over Stevenson Creek was swept away, railway services were disrupted for weeks with parts of the railway line washed away, telegraph poles were toppled and the crossing at Alberga Creek was destroyed.

R. M. Williams worked at Macumba shortly after World War II transporting brumbies to use as bucking stock at the Marrabel Rodeo.

More floods hit the station in 1950 when 7 inches (178 mm) of rain fell in just 48 hours. The creek near the homestead was swollen to 0.5 miles (1 km) wide with some livestock being lost when they were washed downstream.

Macumba had virtually no rain over a period of 14 months until June 2004 when the area received 48 millimetres (2 in) over the course of 10 days. The country had begun to produce fresh feed and had green growth carpeting the plains, which would keep the stock going until the end of summer.

Eddie Nunn was the manager of Macumba in 2004.

Macumba had to be completely destocked in 2008 following a severe and prolonged drought in the area.

The land occupying the extent of the Macumba pastoral lease was gazetted as a locality by the Government of South Australia on 26 April 2013 under the name 'Macumba'.

== See also ==
- List of ranches and stations
- List of the largest stations in Australia
