= Mona Ngitji Ngitji Tur =

Australian linguist and writer (1936–2011)

- Born: 15 July 1936; Hamilton Bore, South Australia
- Died: 28 May 2011 (aged 74); Largs Bay, South Australia
- Occupations: Educator, Oral Linguist, Interpreter, Poet
- Known for: Teaching and interpreting Antakarinya and Pitjantjatjara
- Notable work: Cicada Dreaming (2010)
- Spouse: Jozef Tur (1965– )
- Children: 4
- Parents: John Edward Kennedy (father); Inawantji (mother)
- Honours: Honorary Doctorate (Flinders University)

Mona Ngitji Ngitji Tur, née Kennedy, (15 July 1936 – 28 May 2011) was an Antakirinja/Yankunytjatjara woman from Australia, with numerous cultural connections, who was a cultural educator, oral linguist and interpreter for various organisations in South Australia including many of the Universities there.

She is also a writer, primarily of poetry, as well as being the author of Cicada Dreaming (2010) which is her autobiography.

== Biography ==
Tur was born at Hamilton Bore, on Fifteen Mile Station, in north-western South Australia. Her mother was Inawantji (also known as Mary Tucker), a Antakirinja/Yankunytjatjara woman who also had Arrernte connections and her father, John Edward Kennedy, was an railway fettler with Irish/Scottish ancestry. Her parents maintained their relationship throughout her younger childhood, however, due to assimilation based policies their relationship was officially banned by the government and they did not live together.

Because of this Tur lived with her mother at the station, in a kanku (humpy) alongside extended family, while her father lived at the fettler's hut (railway worker accommodation) and visited on weekends. Her father was also briefly jailed for his relationship with her mother. Perhaps due to this separation Tur was able to grow up speaking in her mother's language and collecting bush food and performing ceremonies, however, she was always afraid of being taken from them due to her status as a 'mixed' child.

Tur was not taken as her uncle was employed as a tracker by the police and he would give her mother advance warning on when the police would come. However, there was one incident, when Tur was around 5 years old, where the police came with no warning and, to hide her, Inawantji buried her up to her neck and covered her head with a blanket and lied to the police when questioned. In describing this incident Tur stated:

So Mother said to me, Ngitji Ngitji - I have a traditional name called Ngitji Ngitji which is like a noise made by the cicada - she said, Ngitji Ngitji, I haven't got time to run away with you because the policeman will see me running away with you, so she said, I'm gonna dig a hole inside the kanku. She dug the hole inside the kanku, she put me in and she covered me right up to my neck in red desert sand and just let my neck stick out, and she shooed the dogs on top of me, and remember it's very, very hot outside. She said to me, You mustn't make any noise whatsoever because you'll be taken away forever, and once again she reminded me about my relatives that had been taken away.

— Mona Tur, in an interview with Sue Anderson as a part of the Bringing Them Home Oral History Project (2001)

Around the late 1930s her father was transferred to Alice Springs and later, in 1941, Inawantji gave birth to Tur's half sister Gloria.

In 1943 the family had to leave the station, because of food shortages caused by overgrazing and the depletion of bush foods, and they settled in Oodnadatta where the government was running a food depot. They first lived on the fringes of the settlement before being offered a room in someone else's house which meant that Tur was able to attend the school there. At the time of starting school Tur was not able to speak any English.

In 1947, when Tur was 11, Inawantji left Oodnadatta with her new partner Dick Carroll (an Arrernte man who later became her husband) who had found work on a cattle station. Tur remained in town and boarded at the Oodnadatta Children's Home, run by the United Aborigines Mission (UAM), which had recently reopened. Tur remained there until 1950 at which point she spent some time with her mother before moving to Adelaide where she worked as a domestic servant; in this role she helped raise three children.

In 1954, Tur returned to the children's home as a staff member and then to other missions and institutions run by the UAM before deciding to study at the Aborigines Inland Mission Bible Training College in Whittingham, New South Wales between 1956 and 1958. After this Tur took a number of roles in various parts of Australia, primarily as a cook or cleaner, at UAM and government institutions for Aboriginal children until 1968. This disappointed Tur as she made numerous requests to be able to work in Oodnadatta where much of her family were.

In 1965, Tur married Jozef (Joe) Tur who was a Polish immigrant to Australia and they had two children together (born in 1968 and 1971) which added to the two children Tur already had.

In 1973, Tur began working for the University of Adelaide, teaching Pitjantjatjara, and she assisted in the production of a Pitjantjatjara teaching kit Wangka Kulintjaku (talk so as to be understood). She also started to work in an official capacity as an interpreter for the Aboriginal Legal Rights Movement and, at the same time, began writing and publishing short stories and poems in both Antikirinya and English.

In 1982, Tur was recognised as an Elder by her community on the Aṉangu Pitjantjatjara Yankunytjatjara Lands while continuing to work as an interpreter for the rest of her life for various Aboriginal organisations, in schools and at universities and for Native Title claims.

Tur was also an activist and in the late 1990s and early 2000s she supported the Irati Wanti (the poison, leave it) campaign, alongside other senior women, to prevent the building a nuclear waste dump at Billa Kalina, near Coober Pedy.

In 2010, Tur published her autobiography Cicada Dreaming and the title of this book is likely taking from her Aṉangu name Ngitji Ngitji which translates as 'cicada'. Soon after in 2011, she was awarded an honorary doctorate by Flinders University.

Tur died on 28 May 2011 at Largs Bay in Adelaide.

== Oral histories ==
A number of oral history recordings, made with Tur, are available at the State Library of South Australia. These include:

- Interview with Mona Tur [sound recording] Interviewer: Simone Tur (1988).
- Interview with Hazel Norris and Mona Tur [sound recording] Interviewer: Simone Tur (1988).
- Interview with Mona Tur [sound recording] Interviewer: John Dallwitz (1992).

An interview with Tur, recorded for the Bringing Them Home oral history project, is also available at the National Library of Australia:

- Mona Ngitji Ngitji Tur [sound recording] Interviewer: Sue Anderson (2001).
