= Allendale, West Virginia =

Unincorporated community in West Virginia, United States

Allendale
- Unincorporated community
- Location within the state of West Virginia Allendale (the United States)
- Coordinates: 40°1′7″N 80°42′12″W
- Country: United States
- State: West Virginia
- County: Marshall
- Elevation: 1,273 ft (388 m)
- Time zone: UTC-5 (Eastern (EST))
  - Summer (DST): UTC-4 (EDT)
- GNIS ID: 1553710

Allendale is an unincorporated community in Marshall County, West Virginia, United States.
