= Alan Dale (disambiguation) =

Alan Dale (born 1947) is a New Zealand / Australian actor.

Alan Dale may also refer to:

- Alan Dale (footballer) (1929–2007), Australian rules footballer
- Alan Dale (singer) (1925–2002), American traditional popular and rock 'n' roll singer
- Alan Dale (critic) (1861–1928), English theatre critic
- Alan Dale, the lead character in Angus Donald's Outlaw Chronicles series of novels

== See also ==
- Alan-a-Dale (disambiguation)
- Allendale (disambiguation)
