= Allandale, Florida =

Unincorporated community in Florida, U.S.

Coordinates: 29°07′18″N 80°58′35″W

Allandale is an unincorporated community in Volusia County, Florida, United States.

Allandale is surrounded on three sides by the city of Port Orange, with the remainder bordering the Halifax River.

== History ==
The community of Allandale was first advertised in the Daytona Daily News in December 1914, described as a "bungalow community", with advertisements emphasizing riverside lots facing the Halifax River. There was also a winter post office operating in Allandale from 1916 to 1941.
