= Todmorden Station (pastoral lease) =

Pastoral lease in South Australia

Coordinates: 27.139°S 134.75647°E

Location in South Australia

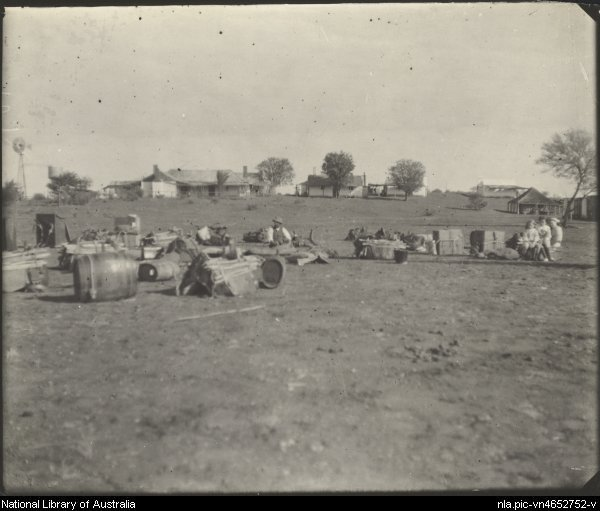
Joseph Breaden's Todmorden Station, c. 1920

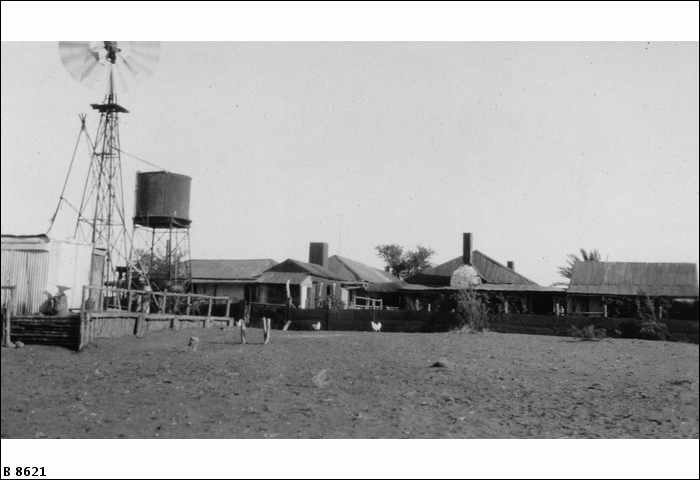
Todmorden c. 1932

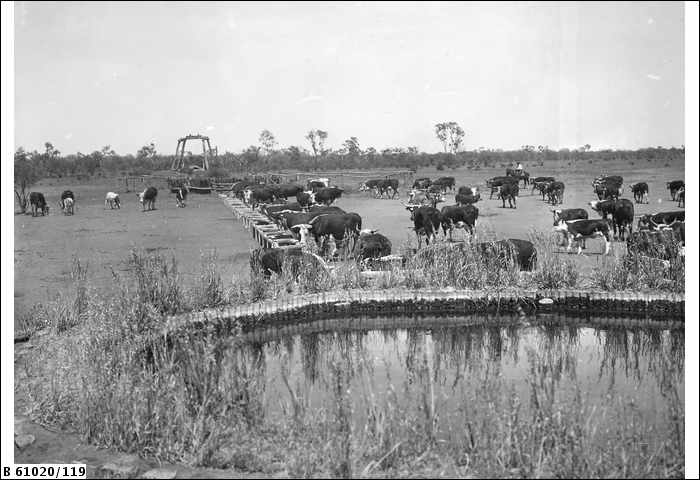
Cattle on the Todmorden Station c. 1950

Todmorden Station, most commonly known as Todmorden, is a pastoral lease that operates as a cattle station in South Australia.

== Location ==
The property is situated approximately 82 kilometres (51 mi) north west of Oodnadatta and 114 kilometres (71 mi) east of Marla. The region is arid with several ephemeral creeks passing through the property including Alberga, Olarinna, and Coongra Creeks, many of which have semi-permanent waterholes suitable for watering stock. The Oodnadatta Track runs through the property between Oodnadatta and Marla. The property is bounded to the north by Lambina and Hamilton Stations, to the east by Macumba, to the west by Wellbourn Hill, and to the south by Arckaringa and Wintinna Stations.

== Description ==
Todmorden currently occupies an area of 7,169 square kilometres (2,768 sq mi) sub-divided into 32 paddocks, and supports between 5000 and 7000 head of cattle. The property has an average rainfall of 175 millimetres (7 in), but rainfall is highly variable, and so stock are watered mostly from the 32 bores on the property. The country is rangeland with sand dunes and mulga country found to the north, central gibber plains, and sandy gravel creek beds supporting stands of coolibah along the creeks flowing into large clay pans. The area supports large stands of Mitchell grass and saltbush, all suitable fodder for stock.

The current owner is the Todmorden Cattle Company, a family partnership made up of the Lillecrapp family; Gordon, Mary, and Douglas Lillecrapp and Mary-Ann McMichael. The Company runs mostly Poll Hereford cattle and also owns three properties much further south in the Mid North region.

== History ==
The traditional owners of the area are the Yankunytjatjara and Antikirinya peoples, with connections also to the Arrernte peoples to the north. The first European to travel through the area was John McDouall Stuart, whose expedition pushed northward past present-day Oodnadatta and the waterholes along the Neales River in 1860. The Overland Telegraph was constructed in 1872, passing right through present-day Todmorden; this in turn led to the first pastoral leases being issued in the area, most being held by land speculators. By 1885, most leases in the area were held by a Mr Wooldridge. The Great Northern Railway was completed to Oodnadatta in 1891, which allowed easier transportation of stock to markets in Adelaide and made pastoralism in the area far more attractive. Two brothers, Edmund and Walter Parke from Todmorden in West Yorkshire, United Kingdom, formed a partnership with Charles Walker and took up many leases within the present station boundaries and named the run after their hometown Mount Todmorden Station. The homestead was constructed along the Alberga Creek in the 1890s.

Both Todmorden and Henbury Station were owned by the partnership when Edmund Parke died in 1901.

Joseph Albert Breaden acquired Todmorden in 1902 from the Parke and Walker partnership. At this stage, the property occupied an area of approximately 7,000 square miles (18,130 km^{2}) of country and was sold with all cattle included. In 1906, Breaden sold his stock because of drought. In 1907, explorer Frank Hann passed through the property on his return journey from Western Australia and reported the Alberga as completely dry, and all the soaks in the area as being dried out. The area was then flooded in 1908 after 6.5 inches (165 mm) fell over a couple of days, submerging Todmorden and many surrounding stations.

Breaden sold up in 1923 to retire to Glenelg. The 2,800-square-mile (7,252 km^{2}) property, in good condition, was acquired by the Young brothers, along with 3000 head of cattle and 1500 horses. In 1927, the area was again struck by drought.

Molly Breaden, Joseph Breaden's daughter, took over the property in 1945 and ran it along with her nephew, David Gardiner, until 1962 when it was acquired by the Lillecrapp family after several years of drought.

In 2004, an Indigenous land use agreement was struck with the Yankunytjatjara and Antakirinja people and other traditional owners so they could access the land while the rights of the lessee would also be respected.

In 2011, five people including the manager Douglas Lillecrapp were stranded at the station following heavy rains and subsequent flooding. The property received its average annual rainfall in 30 hours, with most of the property underwater and flooding through the sheds. Later that year, bushfires raged through the area and approximately 70,000 hectares (172,974 acres) of grazing lands were lost to the fire. Lightning strikes initiated the fire which burnt for nearly two weeks before a 40 kilometres (25 mi) backburn helped bring it under control.

The land occupying the extent of the Todmorden Station pastoral lease was gazetted as a locality in April 2013 under the name "Todmorden".

== See also ==
- List of ranches and stations
