= Alan-A-Dale =

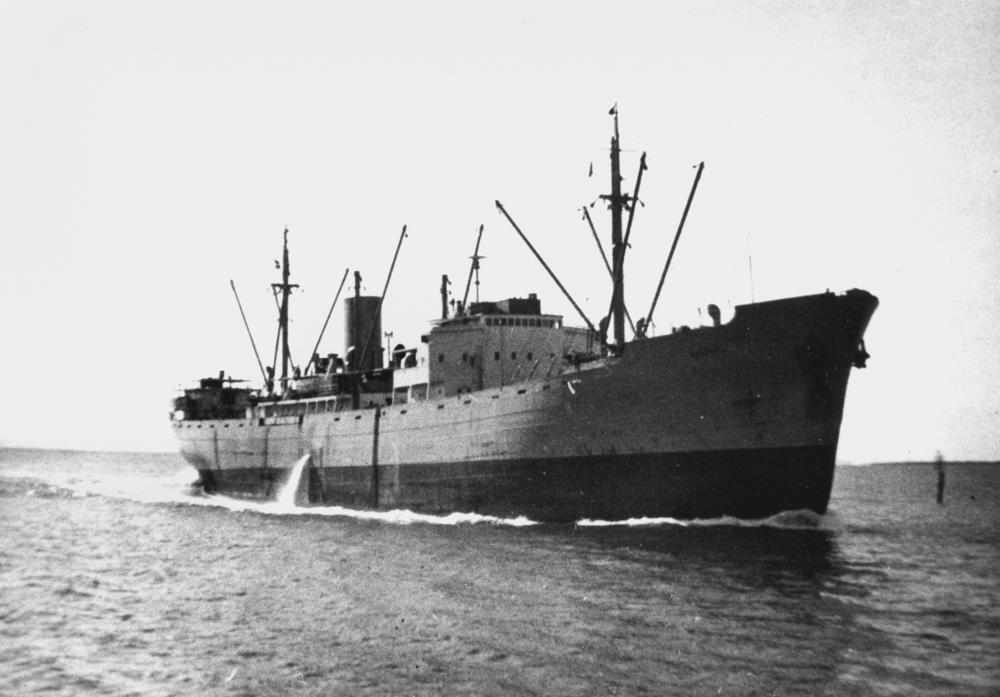
- Nordvest under way

History
- Name: 1938: Nordvest; 1941: Alan-A-Dale
- Owner: 1938: D/S Norden; 1941: US Maritime Commission
- Operator: 1938: P Brown Jr, & Co; 1941: Union SS Co of NZ
- Port of registry: 1938: (Denmark) Copenhagan; 1941: Panama
- Builder: Nakskov Skibsværft A/S, Nakskov
- Yard number: 85
- Completed: June 1938
- Identification: 1938: call sign OYWQ; 1941: call sign HPWV
- Fate: Sunk 23 December 1944

General characteristics
- Type: Cargo ship
- Tonnage: 4,702 GRT, 2,774 NRT
- Length: 122.3 m (401.4 ft)
- Beam: 17.5 m (57.3 ft)
- Depth: 7.6 m (24.9 ft)
- Decks: 1 + shelter deck
- Installed power: 2,300 bhp (1,715 kW), 808 NHP
- Propulsion: 2 × screws; 2 × two-stroke diesel engines
- Speed: 13 knots (24 km/h)
- Complement: 65
- Sensors & processing systems: wireless direction finding

Alan-A-Dale was a cargo motor ship that was built in Denmark in 1938 as Nordvest (lit.: Northwest). In the Second World War the United States requisitioned her in 1941 and renamed her Alan-A-Dale. In December 1944 she was sunk by a German submarine off the coast of the Netherlands.

== Building ==
Nakskov Skibsværft A/S built Nordvest at its yard in Nakskov for D/S Norden, completing her in June 1938. Her registered length was 401.4 ft (122.3 m), her beam was 57.3 ft (17.5 m), her depth 24.9 ft (7.6 m) and her tonnages were 4,702 GRT and 2,774 NRT. She had twin screws, each driven by a six-cylinder, single-acting, two-stroke diesel engine. Between them, her twin engines were rated at 808 NHP.

A/S Norden registered Nordvest at Copenhagen. Her wireless telegraph call sign was OYWQ.

== Service ==
After World War II began, Nordvest remained in port in the United States. She was one of 84 foreign ships that the US Maritime Commission requisitioned under the Ship Requisition Act, Executive Order No. 8771, signed on 6 June 1941.

The Maritime Commission renamed her Alan-A-Dale, transferred her registration to Panama, and her call sign was changed to HPWV. Her name is sometimes referred to as Alan A. Dale, but Lloyd's Register records her as Alan-A-Dale.

The Maritime Commission appointed the Union Steam Ship Company of New Zealand to manage the ship. She would have been defensively armed, as a contingent of the USN Armed Guard joined her complement.

Alan-A-Dale sailed independently for Tocopilla, Chile, arriving there in October 1941, then returned via the Panama Canal to Baltimore in early December. On 15 December 1941, she sailed from Halifax, Nova Scotia to Belfast as part of Convoy HX 165, returning to the United States as part of Convoy ON 59 in January 1942. After another Atlantic crossing, (Convoys HX 179 and ON 89), she sailed alone from Hampton Roads on 1 June 1942, to the Indian Ocean, calling at Cape Town, Abadan, Bahrain and Bombay, before returning via Durban, Trinidad and Guantánamo Bay, and arriving at New York City on 2 November.

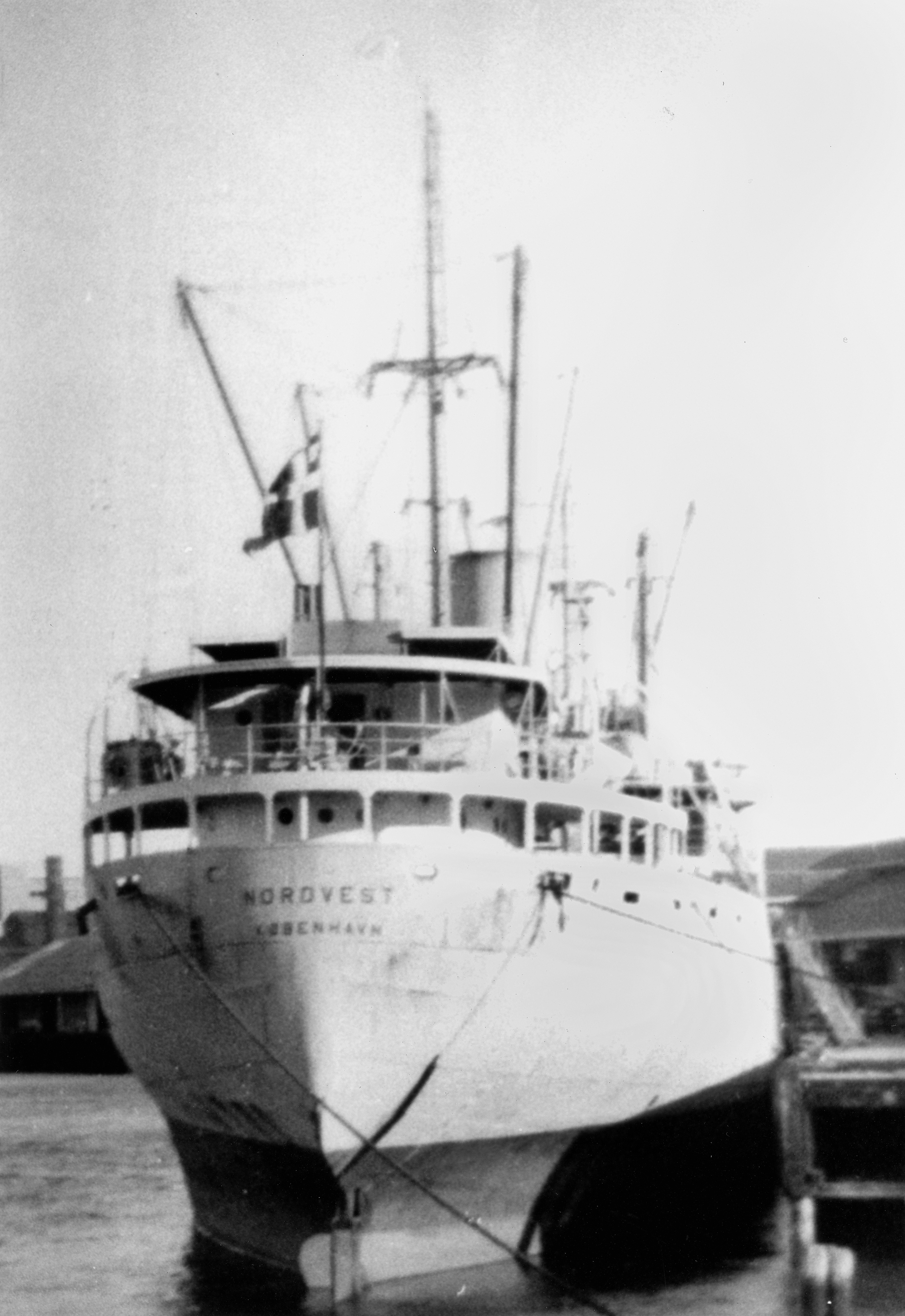
Stern view of Nordvest

Alan-A-Dale then took part in operations following Operation Torch, the Allied invasion of North Africa, sailing between Hampton Roads and Oran three times between December 1942 and July 1943. The ship then returned to Atlantic crossings, making four more return voyages between the East Coast of the United States and ports in Britain between August 1943 and June 1944.

In July 1944, after sailing from New York to Liverpool, she moved to the south coast of England, crossing the English Channel to the Baie de Seine after the Normandy landings, and returning to New York in September 1944. She sailed once more between New York and Liverpool and back in October – November 1944, before sailing from New York in October to the Solent. From there, on 21 December, she sailed as part of Convoy TAM 26, bound for Antwerp.

A German Biber midget submarine sank Alan-A-Dale in the Westerschelde off Terneuzen on 23 December 1944 at position 51°21′36″N 03°47′18″E. All 65 men aboard survived the attack.

The wreck was removed in June 2003 as part of an operation to improve shipping access to Antwerp.
