= Allandale, U.S. Virgin Islands =

Allandale
- Village
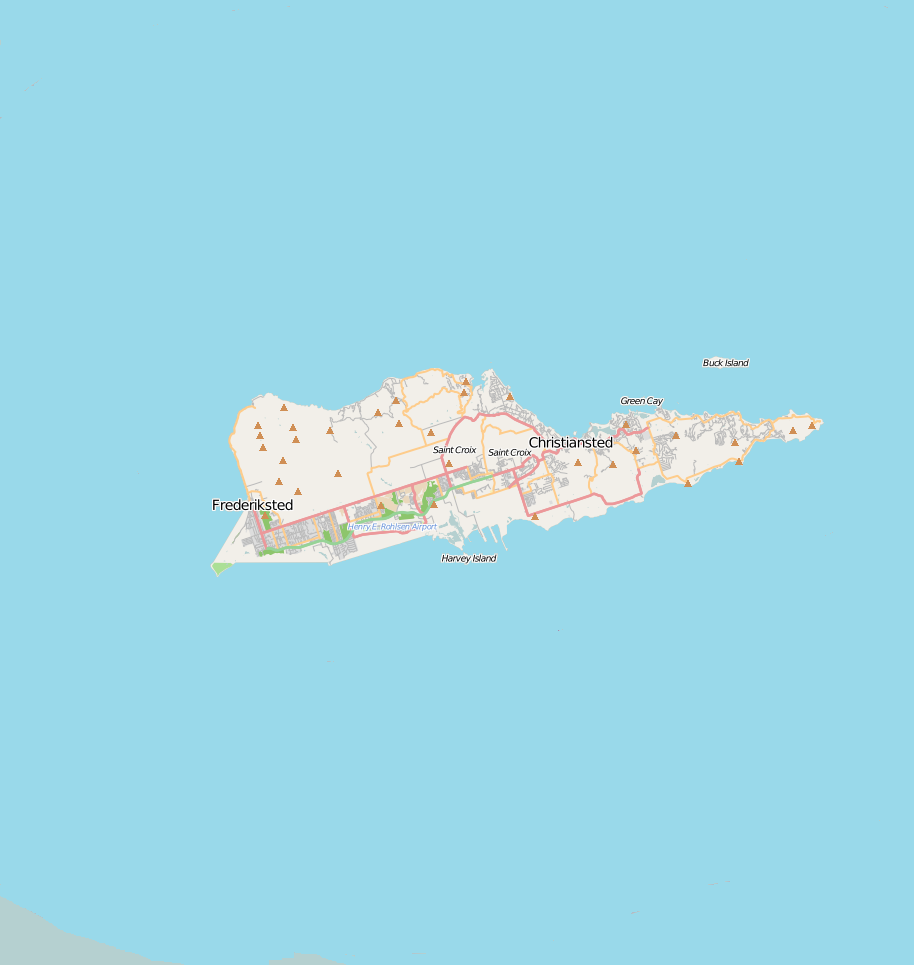
- Location in Saint Croix, United States Virgin Islands
- Coordinates: 17°43′41″N 64°50′25″W
- Country: United States Virgin Islands
- Island: Saint Croix
- Elevation: 318 ft (97 m)

Population (2020)
  - Total: 0
- Time zone: UTC-4 (AST)

Allandale is an uninhabited settlement on the island of Saint Croix in the United States Virgin Islands.

Variant names for this place include Bog of Allen, Allendale, and August Pentheny's Plantage.

== History ==
Bog of Allan or Allandale (Princes Quarter No. 10, Centre °Police District, Frederiksteds Jurisdiction) is a former sugar plantation. In 1816, it covered 130 acres of land of which 100 acres were planted with sugar canes and 30 acres were under other cultivation. 98 enslaved labourers were present on the estate. On 28 September 1850, Allandale was sold by auction to B Connotty tor $12,100. On 7 October 1853, it was sold by auction to a partnership consisting of W. W. Coker, A. Tower and Jane C. Dewhurst, for $8000, On 4 November 1854, it was sold by them to J. W. Bushby, for $7,500. On 2 February 1858, it was sold by J, W. Bushby to William Heyliger for $18,000.
