= Neales River =

River in South Australia

Neales Neales Overflow
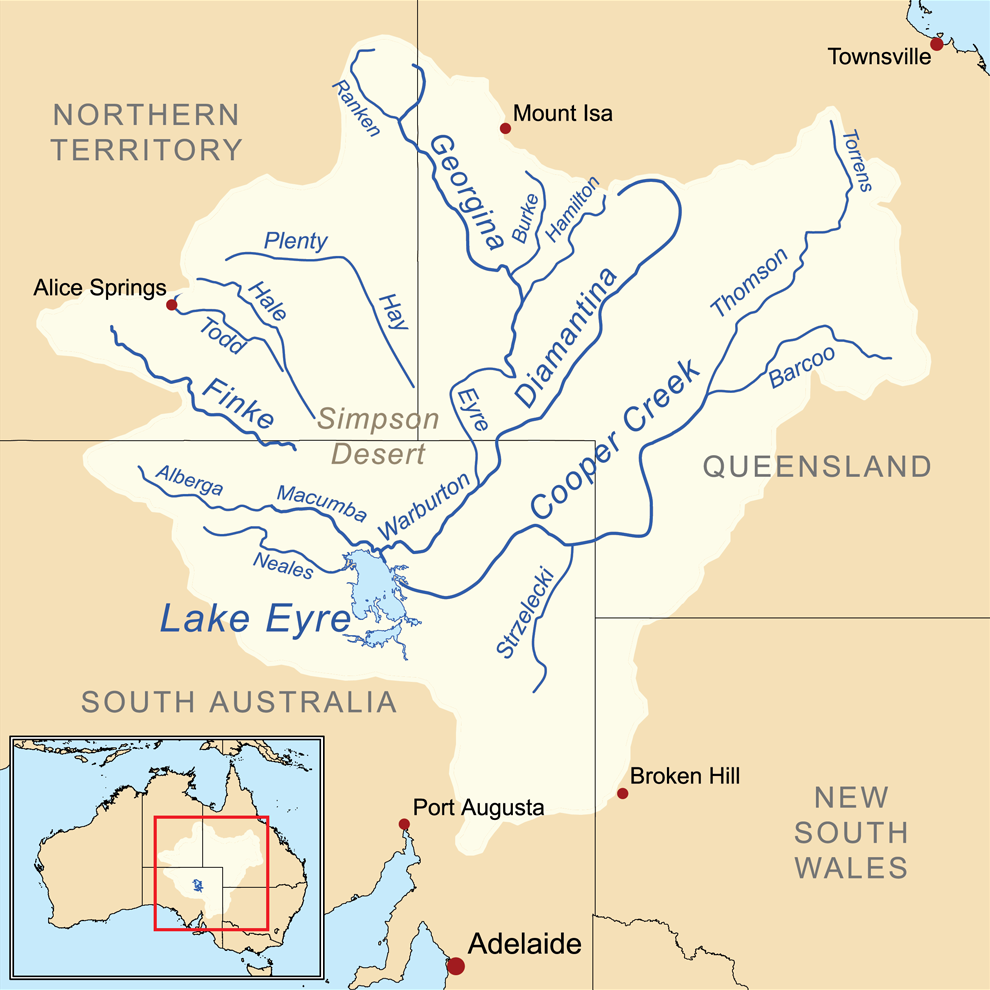
- A map of the Lake Eyre basin showing Neales River

- Location of the river mouth in South Australia
- Etymology: In honour of John Bentham Neales

Location
- Country: Australia
- State: South Australia
- Region: Far North

Physical characteristics
- Source: Mount Brougham
  - location: Welbourne Hill
  - elevation: 354 m (1,161 ft)
- Mouth: Lake Eyre
  - coordinates: 28°04′02″S 136°54′03″E
  - elevation: −1 m (−3.3 ft)
- Length: 420 km (260 mi)
- Basin size: 35,000 square kilometres (14,000 sq mi)

Basin features
- River system: Lake Eyre Basin
- Tributaries
  - left: Barlow Creek

The Neales River is a watercourse in the Far North region of the Australian state of South Australia.

The river is a tributary of Lake Eyre. The Central Australia Railway, on which The Ghan passenger train operated until 1980, crossed the Neales River floodplain over Algebuckina Bridge.

Neales River was named by explorer John McDouall Stuart after businessman and politician John Bentham Neales.

== See also ==
- List of rivers of Australia § South Australia
