= Oodnadatta =

- Town
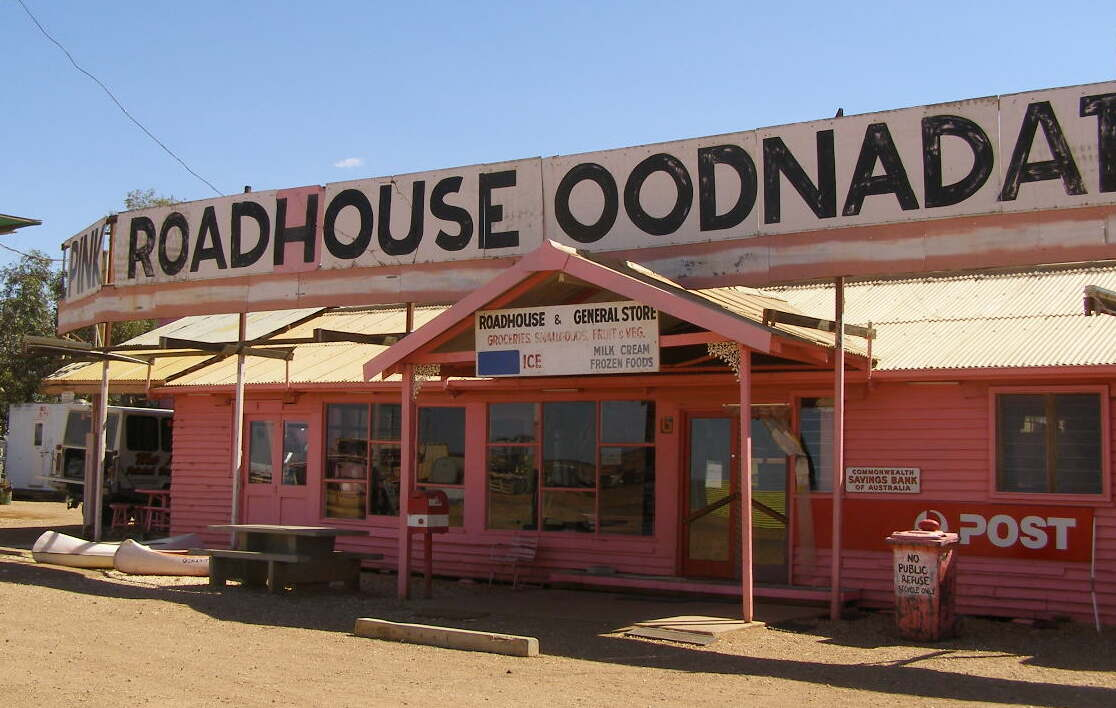
- The Pink Roadhouse at Oodnadatta

- Coordinates: 27°32′53″S 135°26′44″E
- Country: Australia
- State: South Australia
- Region: Far North
- LGA: Pastoral Unincorporated Area
- Location: 873 km (542 mi) N of Adelaide; 544 km (338 mi) N of Port Augusta; 181 km (112 mi) NW of Coober Pedy
- Established: 30 October 1890 (town); 8 February 2001 (locality)

Government
  - State electorate: Giles
  - Federal division: Grey
- Elevation (railway station): 121 m (397 ft)

Population
  - Total: 102 (SAL 2021)
- Time zone: UTC+9:30 (ACST)
  - Summer (DST): UTC+10:30 (ACST)
- Postcode: 5734
- Mean max temp: 29.2 °C (84.6 °F)
- Mean min temp: 14.7 °C (58.5 °F)
- Annual rainfall: 171.8 mm (6.76 in)
Localities around Oodnadatta
Todmorden	Todmorden	Allandale Station
Todmorden	Oodnadatta	Allandale Station
Allandale Station	Allandale Station	Allandale Station
- Locations; Adjoining localities

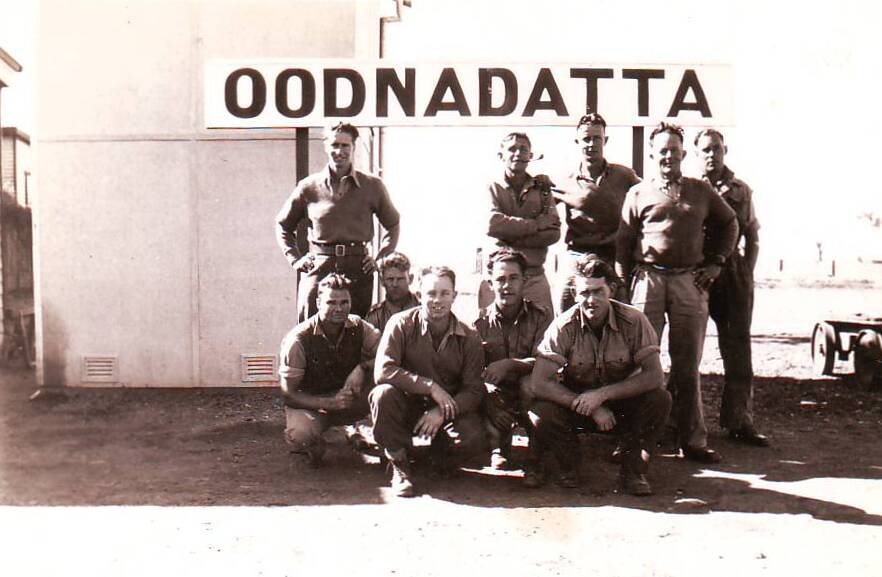
Oodnadatta railway station during World War II

Oodnadatta is a small, remote outback town and locality in the Australian state of South Australia, located 1043 kilometres (648 miles) north-north-west of the state capital of Adelaide by road or 873 km (542 mi) direct, at an altitude of 112 metres (367 feet). The unsealed Oodnadatta Track, an outback road popular with tourists, runs through the town.

== Facilities and Early History ==
Town facilities include a hotel, caravan park, post office, general stores, police station, hospital, fuel and minor mechanical repairs. The old railway station now serves as a museum. From the 1880s to the 1930s, Oodnadatta was a base for camel drivers and their animals, which provided cartage when the railway was under construction and along outback tracks before roads were established.

== Post-Railway Era ==
After the railway line was lifted, Oodnadatta's role changed from that of a government service centre and supply depot for surrounding pastoral properties to a residential freehold town for Aboriginal families who, moving from cattle work, bought empty houses as their railway employee occupants left.

== Origin of name ==
Two meanings of the name are recorded. One derives from the Aboriginal word utnadata, meaning "yellow blossom of the mulga". However, mulga trees do not grow anywhere near the town. The alternative meaning is coodnadatta or kudnadatta, meaning "dead man's poo": the first two syllables encompass "rotten" or "excreta" and the second two refer to "there".

== History ==
For tens of thousands of years, Aboriginal tribes visited the place where Oodnadatta is located as a reliable source of water on their trade route; there was no settlement at Oodnadatta itself. John McDouall Stuart explored the region in 1859. His route was generally followed by the surveyors of the Overland Telegraph Line, completed in 1872. Alfred Giles referred to a place called the Yellow Waterhole, or Angle Pole, later known as Hookey's Waterhole and The Peake, near Oodnadatta. The course chosen for the Central Australia Railway likewise followed the route because a water supply was essential for steam locomotives. From 1891, Oodnadatta was an important station on the railway until the line closed in 1981, to be replaced in 2004 by the Adelaide–Darwin rail corridor about 160 km (100 mi) to the west.

=== Telegraphs, camels and railways ===
Angle Pole (27°30′13″S 135°24′57″E) is the point near Oodnadatta where the direction of the telegraph line changed to a more northerly direction. It is near the Peake cattle station, also known as "The Peake", or Freeling Springs. The ruins of Peake telegraph station exist on the station today. Alfred Giles refers to his only meeting with the explorer Ernest Giles (no relation) at "the Peake" in the 1870s.

By the 1880s the telegraph route was being used by camel trains, many led by "Afghan" cameleers (actually from many different places in the Indian subcontinent), or'Ghans, as they became known, who were brought to Australia for the task of hauling goods into Central Australia for pioneer settlers. Many of the cameleers settled in Oodnadatta and Marree, some with families and some marrying, mainly Aboriginal women.

In the 1880s, Angle Pole was identified as the proposed terminus for the extension of the Great Northern Railway. When the railway was built, a town was established here, and in October 1890 was proclaimed a government township and renamed Oodnadatta.

In 1889, Angle Pole was also proposed as the south-eastern terminus of a land grant railway from Roebuck Bay in Western Australia. This railway was proposed by a London syndicate and would have been about 1000 miles (1600 km) long, with the wider 1,600 mm (5 ft 3 in) gauge. However this was never built.

The town remained the terminus of the Great Northern Railway until the line was extended to Alice Springs in 1929 and the railway's name was changed to the Central Australia Railway. The railway was built with narrow gauge (1,067 mm (3 ft 6 in)) tracks, and train traffic was frequently disrupted by washouts and other damage to the trackbed, leading to a slow and unreliable service. The railway through Oodnadatta was closed and a new standard gauge line was built to the west, bypassing Oodnadatta, and opening in October 1980.

=== World War II ===
Oodnadatta's busiest era was World War II when the Australian Army and the Royal Australian Air Force set up local facilities to service troop trains and aircraft en route to Darwin.

=== 21st century ===
Tourist traffic along the Oodnadatta Track and the mining industry keep the village alive. The Aboriginal school is the biggest employer.

In 2018, the federal government announced a major upgrade to the Track, to better serve both the tourists and truck drivers on this major freight and cattle transport route.

In 2023, a reverse osmosis water desalination plant was installed in the town, giving it access to treated drinking tap water for the first time. The town's drinking water supply was previously untreated groundwater from the Great Artesian Basin, which the state government warned residents to avoid as early as the 1980s due to the risk of the rare life-threatening brain infection primary amoebic meningoencephalitis.

== Access, facilities, attractions ==
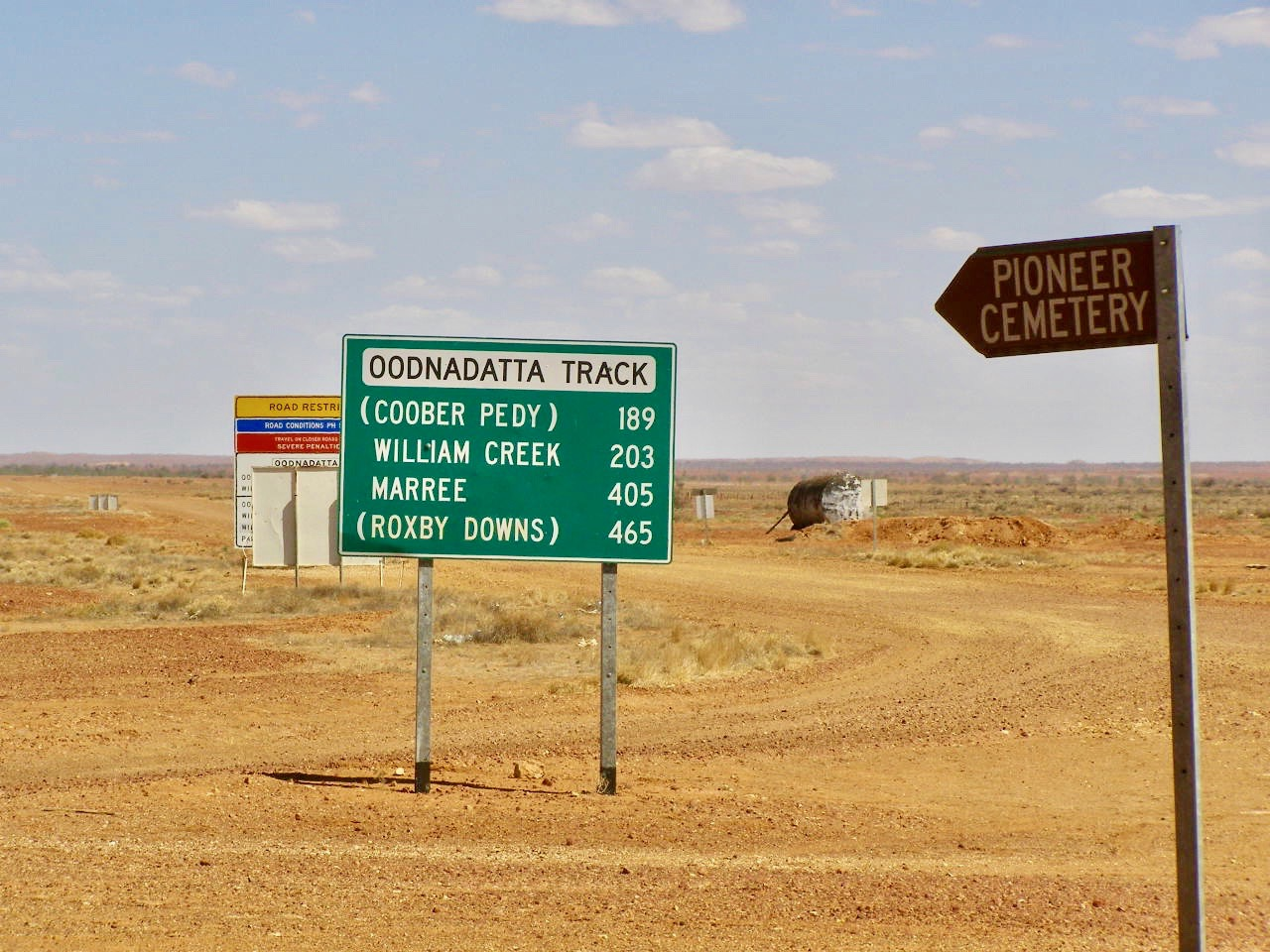
Oodnadatta Track sign

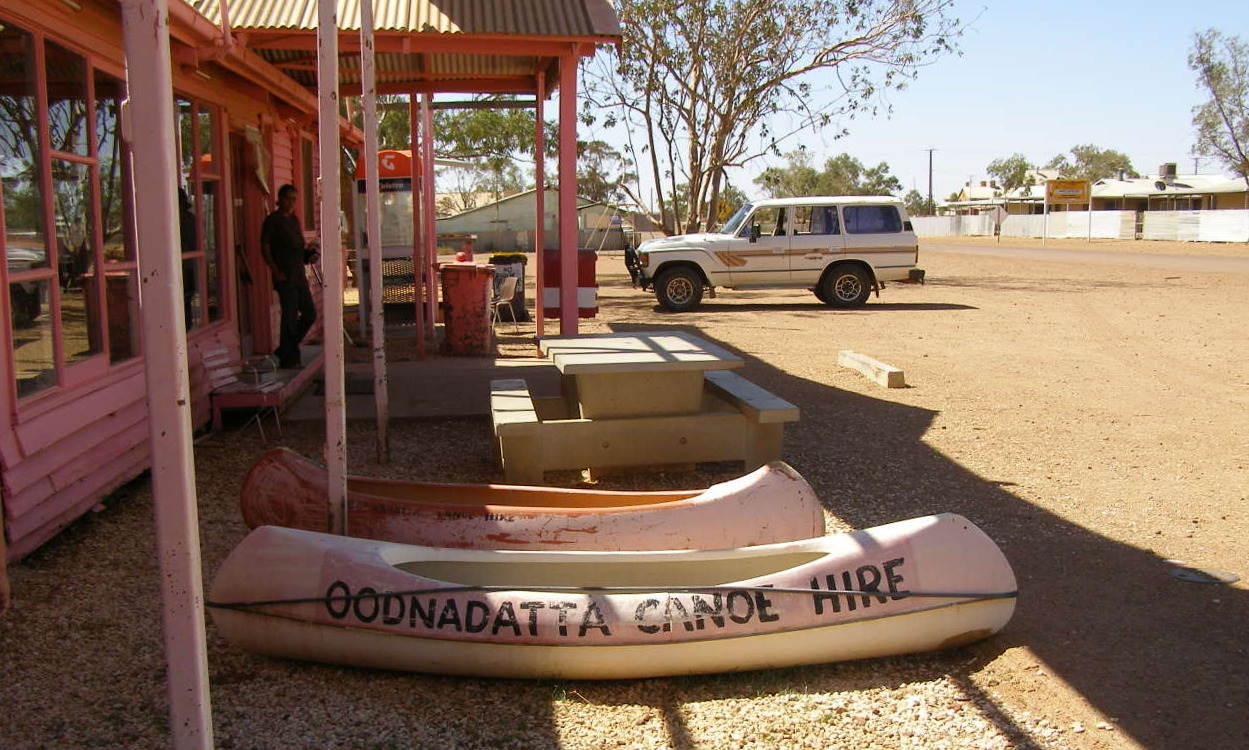
Canoe hire

Oodnadatta can be reached by an unsealed road from Coober Pedy or via the unsealed Oodnadatta Track from Marree to Marla or from the north via Finke/Aputula, NT (on the "Old Ghan Heritage Trail").

The Pink Roadhouse (so-called because it is painted bright pink) provides petrol, a general store, meals, a variety of accommodation, and post office facilities. The Transcontinental Hotel, built in the 1890s, is on the same side of the road, as is the caravan park.

Oodnadatta is serviced twice weekly by the Coober Pedy Oodnadatta One Day Mail Run. The OKA mail truck also carries some general freight and passengers.

The 1290 metres (1410 yards) air strip adjacent to the town, originally built during World War II, has a sealed surface.

=== Historic buildings ===
The historic Oodnadatta railway station, now a museum, is listed on the South Australian Heritage Register.

== Oodnadatta Aboriginal School ==
The Oodnadatta Aboriginal School, located in Kutaya Terrace, is a school operated by the Government of South Australia offering education from Reception to Year 12. In 2018, the school had a total enrolment of 14 students, of whom 86% were indigenous, and a teaching staff of three.

== Climate ==
Oodnadatta has a hot desert climate (Köppen: BWh), with extremely hot summers and mild winters. The town's position in the Outback causes large seasonal variation. Average maxima vary from 38.0 °C (100.4 °F) in January to 19.8 °C (67.6 °F) in July while average minima fluctuate between 23.2 °C (73.8 °F) in January and 5.9 °C (42.6 °F) in July. Mean average annual precipitation is very low: 171.8 mm (6.76 in), spread between 34.4 precipitation days. The town is very sunny, with 182.5 clear days and only 59.1 cloudy days per annum. There is a large sign in Oodnadatta claiming the town is "The driest town, the driest state of the driest Continent".

Extreme temperatures have ranged from −4.0 °C (24.8 °F) on 16 July 1979 to 50.7 °C (123.3 °F) on 2 January 1960, the highest reliably measured maximum temperature in Australia. The 50.7 °C (123.3 °F) temperature on 2 January 1960 was also the highest temperature ever recorded in the Southern Hemisphere. These records stood unequalled until 13 January 2022, when a temperature of 50.7 °C (123.3 °F) was measured in Onslow, Western Australia, thus equalling Oodnadatta's record. A higher temperature was recorded at Cloncurry in 1889; however, this has since been shown to have been recorded in a non-standard enclosure and likely to have been considerably cooler than first believed.

Climate data for Oodnadatta (27º39'36"S, 135º27'00"E, 117 m AMSL) (1939-2024 normals and extremes)
Month	Jan	Feb	Mar	Apr	May	Jun	Jul	Aug	Sep	Oct	Nov	Dec	Year
Record high °C (°F)	50.7 (123.3)	48.7 (119.7)	46.1 (115.0)	42.1 (107.8)	35.0 (95.0)	32.8 (91.0)	32.2 (90.0)	39.4 (102.9)	40.7 (105.3)	45.4 (113.7)	47.4 (117.3)	48.4 (119.1)	50.7 (123.3)
Mean daily maximum °C (°F)	38.0 (100.4)	36.7 (98.1)	33.9 (93.0)	28.6 (83.5)	23.3 (73.9)	19.9 (67.8)	19.8 (67.6)	22.3 (72.1)	26.8 (80.2)	30.5 (86.9)	33.8 (92.8)	36.5 (97.7)	29.2 (84.5)
Mean daily minimum °C (°F)	23.2 (73.8)	22.4 (72.3)	19.4 (66.9)	14.5 (58.1)	9.8 (49.6)	6.5 (43.7)	5.9 (42.6)	7.5 (45.5)	11.6 (52.9)	15.2 (59.4)	18.7 (65.7)	21.4 (70.5)	14.7 (58.4)
Record low °C (°F)	11.7 (53.1)	12.8 (55.0)	9.5 (49.1)	3.8 (38.8)	0.9 (33.6)	−2.6 (27.3)	−2.2 (28.0)	−0.3 (31.5)	2.2 (36.0)	5.1 (41.2)	9.6 (49.3)	11.3 (52.3)	−2.6 (27.3)
Average precipitation mm (inches)	24.1 (0.95)	29.4 (1.16)	13.8 (0.54)	11.1 (0.44)	11.8 (0.46)	11.7 (0.46)	8.9 (0.35)	8.0 (0.31)	10.0 (0.39)	13.4 (0.53)	12.8 (0.50)	16.9 (0.67)	171.8 (6.76)
Average precipitation days (≥ 0.2 mm)	3.1	2.6	2.4	2.3	2.6	3.2	2.4	2.4	2.6	3.6	3.7	3.5	34.4
Average afternoon relative humidity (%)	20	23	22	25	32	37	34	28	23	19	18	18	25
Average dew point °C (°F)	7.0 (44.6)	8.2 (46.8)	6.4 (43.5)	4.9 (40.8)	4.3 (39.7)	3.5 (38.3)	2.0 (35.6)	0.9 (33.6)	1.1 (34.0)	1.2 (34.2)	2.9 (37.2)	4.7 (40.5)	3.9 (39.1)
Mean monthly sunshine hours	337.9	296.6	313.1	273.0	244.9	231.0	254.2	275.9	291.0	316.2	321.0	341.0	3,495.8
Percentage possible sunshine	80	81	83	80	73	74	77	80	81	80	79	79	79
Source: Bureau of Meteorology (1939-2024 normals and extremes)

== Governance ==
Oodnadatta is located within the federal Division of Grey, the state electoral district of Stuart, the Pastoral Unincorporated Area of South Australia and the state's Far North region. In the absence of a local government authority, the community in Oodnadatta receives municipal services from a state government agency, the Outback Communities Authority.

== Oodnadatta on Mars ==
The name Oodnadatta has been used as a name for a crater on the planet Mars.

== People ==
- John Tackaberry (1912 – 1969), a writer on the top-rated Jack Benny Show for over a decade, and also the co-writer of the 1946 hit single "Pickle In The Middle", spent his childhood in Oodnadatta.
- Mona Ngitji Ngitji Tur (1936 – 2011), a Antakirinja/Yankunytjatjara woman, spent much of her early life in Oodnadatta and attended school there.

== See also ==
- List of extreme temperatures in Australia
