= Israel Border Police =

Gendarmerie and border security branch of the Israel Police

Israel Border Police מִשְׁמַר הַגְּבוּל Mišmar Ha-Gvul
- Emblem of Magav

- Flag of Israel Border Police
- Common name: Magav

Agency overview
- Formed: 1953
- Preceding agency: Frontier Corps (Note: Not to be confused with the Frontier Corps of Pakistan)
- Employees: ≈8,000 soldiers and officers

Jurisdictional structure
- National agency: Israel
- Operations jurisdiction: Israel
- Governing body: Israel Police
- General nature: Gendarmerie; Local civilian police
- Specialist jurisdiction: National border patrol, security, integrity

Website
- www.police.gov.il

The Israel Border Police (Hebrew: מִשְׁמַר הַגְּבוּל, romanized: Mišmar Ha-Gvul, lit. 'Guard of the Border') is the gendarmerie and border security branch of the Israel Police. It is not part of the military, despite carrying out duties which go beyond regular policing and being staffed through the regular national military recruitment system. It is also commonly known by its Hebrew abbreviation Magav. (Note: (מג״ב), meaning border guard; its members are colloquially known as magavnikim (מג״בניקים; singular magavnik)) While its main task is securing Israel's borders, it has also been deployed to assist the IDF, and for counter-terrorism and law enforcement operations in the Israeli-occupied West Bank and in Jerusalem.

The Israeli Border Police is known to include many soldiers from minority backgrounds, being a particularly popular choice for Druze recruits, and also including many soldiers from Circassian, Arab Christian, and Bedouin backgrounds.

== History ==
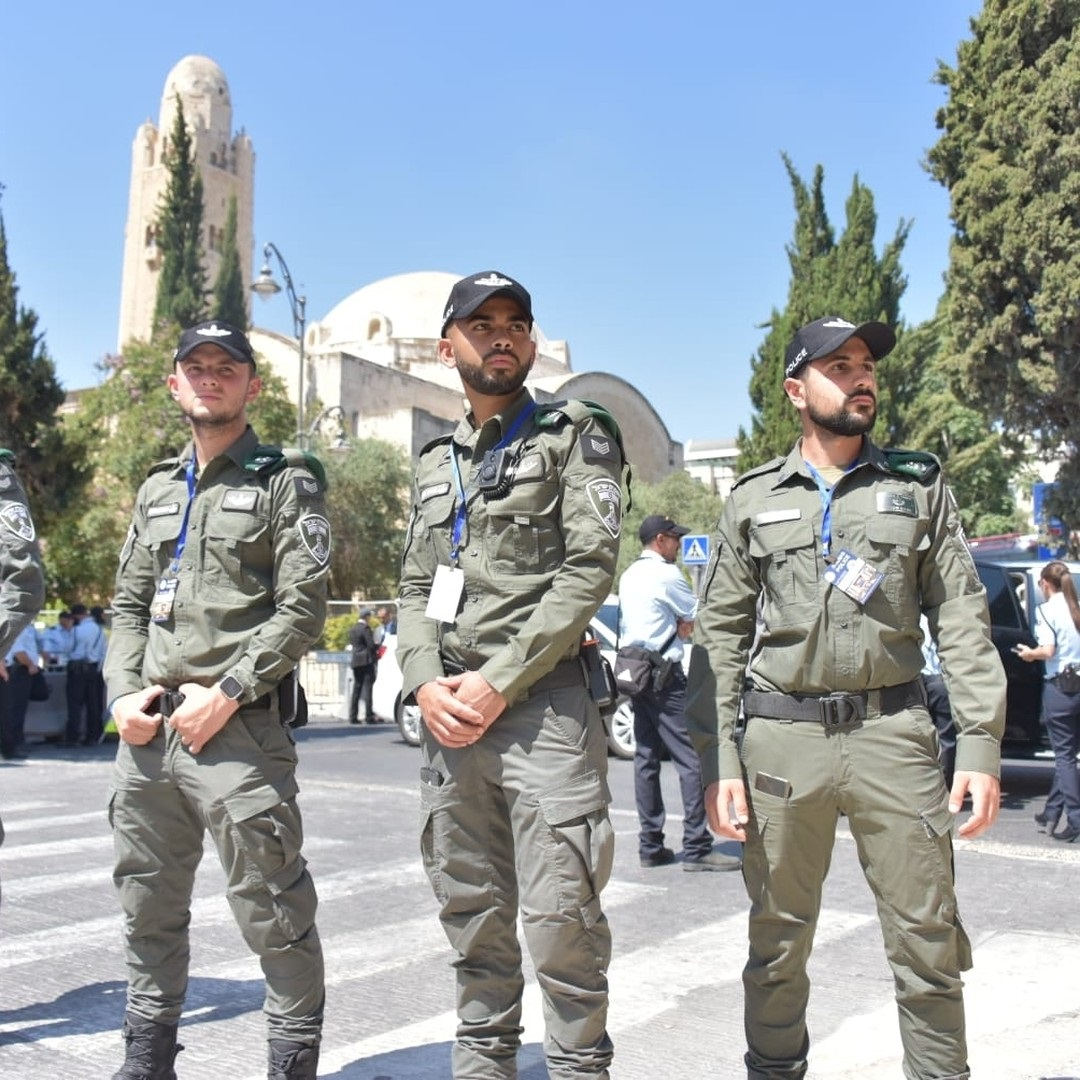
Magavniks in Jerusalem monitor Joe Biden's visit to Israel in July 2022.

The Border Police was founded in 1949 as the Frontier Corps (חיל הספר, Heil HaSfar), a gendarmerie under the IDF with the task of providing security in rural areas and along the borders. Over the following years, it was gradually transferred to the command of the Police and became the Border Police. During these years, it secured new settlements and countered infiltration of Palestinian fedayeen, especially from Egypt and Jordan.

During the 1956 Suez War, the Border Police was involved in the Kafr Qasim massacre. On the second day of the war, a curfew was imposed on the Israeli Arab village. Villagers who had worked in the village fields and were apparently unaware of the curfew were shot as they returned to the village, resulting in 49 dead. This event was strongly protested by the Israeli public and resulted in a landmark Supreme Court ruling on the obligation of soldiers to disobey manifestly illegal orders.

During the 1967 Six-Day War, the Border Police fought alongside the IDF. After the war, it was deployed in the West Bank and Gaza Strip and charged with maintaining law and order as part of the military administration of Israeli-occupied territories. Since then, a significant portion of the Border Police's activity has been in these territories, especially during the years of the First Intifada and the Second (al-Aqsa) Intifada.

In 1974, the counter-terror unit Yamam was established.

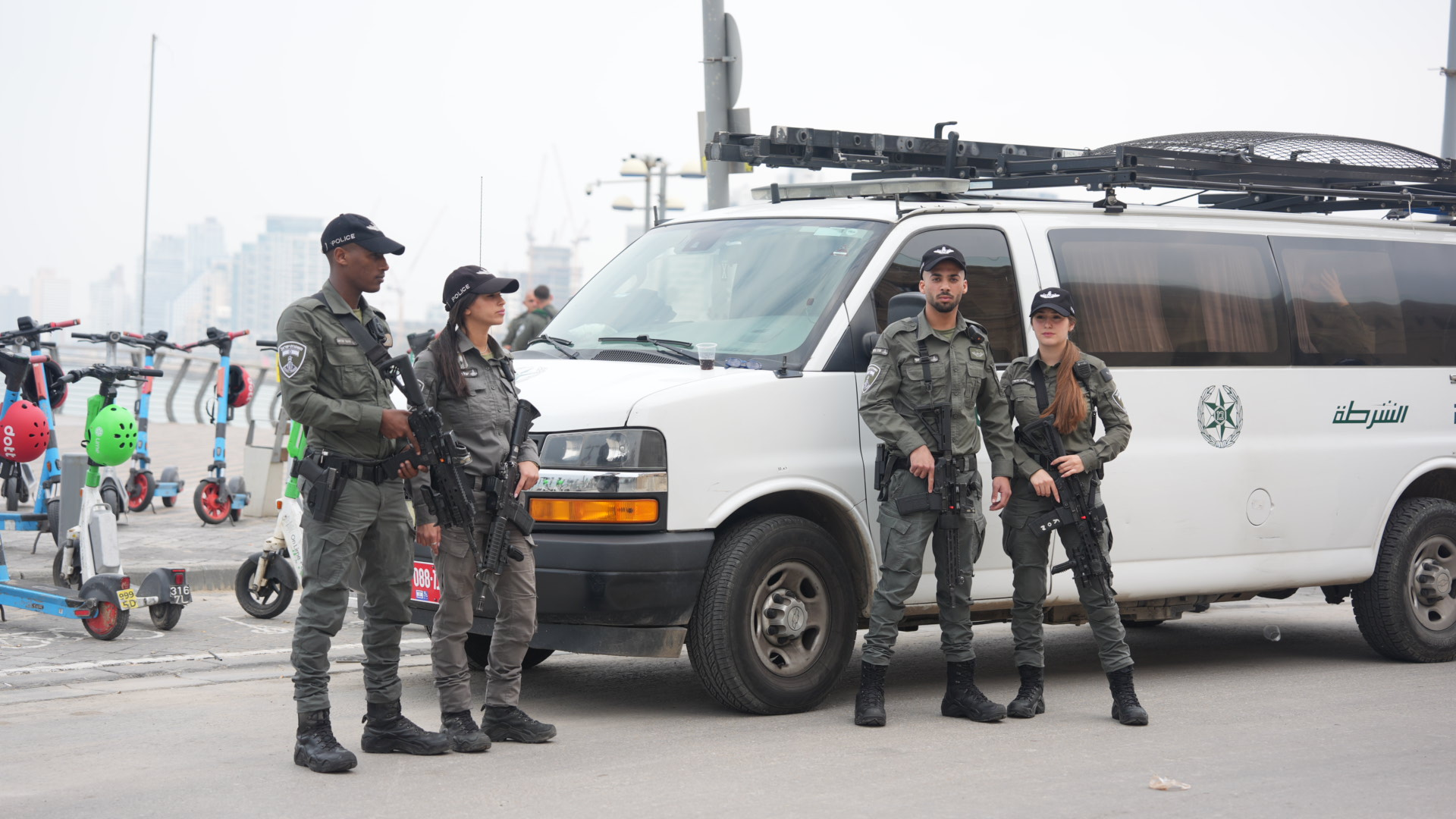
Magavnikim with an Israel Border Police Chevrolet Express van on the Tel Aviv Promenade in Tel Aviv.

In the 2000 October Riots, the Border Police was used as the main branch of the treatment in the events. During the Second Intifada, the Border Police took a large part in the security activity.

In 2005, the Border Police participated in the implementation of the Israeli disengagement from Gaza.

The Border Police's heaviest area of operation is Jerusalem. Virtually all "soldiers" seen patrolling Jerusalem's streets are Border Guard Police officers. Approximately 20% of all Border Guard personnel in the country are in Jerusalem. Jerusalem MAGAV also provides security and conducts military operations, raids, and arrests on Palestinians in cities like Jenin, Nablus, Jericho, Qalqilya, Tulkarm, Ramallah, and Hebron.

In 2023, the National Guard of Israel was formed and attached to the Israel Border Police.

The number of Border Guards is believed to be about 6,000 soldiers and officers.

== Structure ==
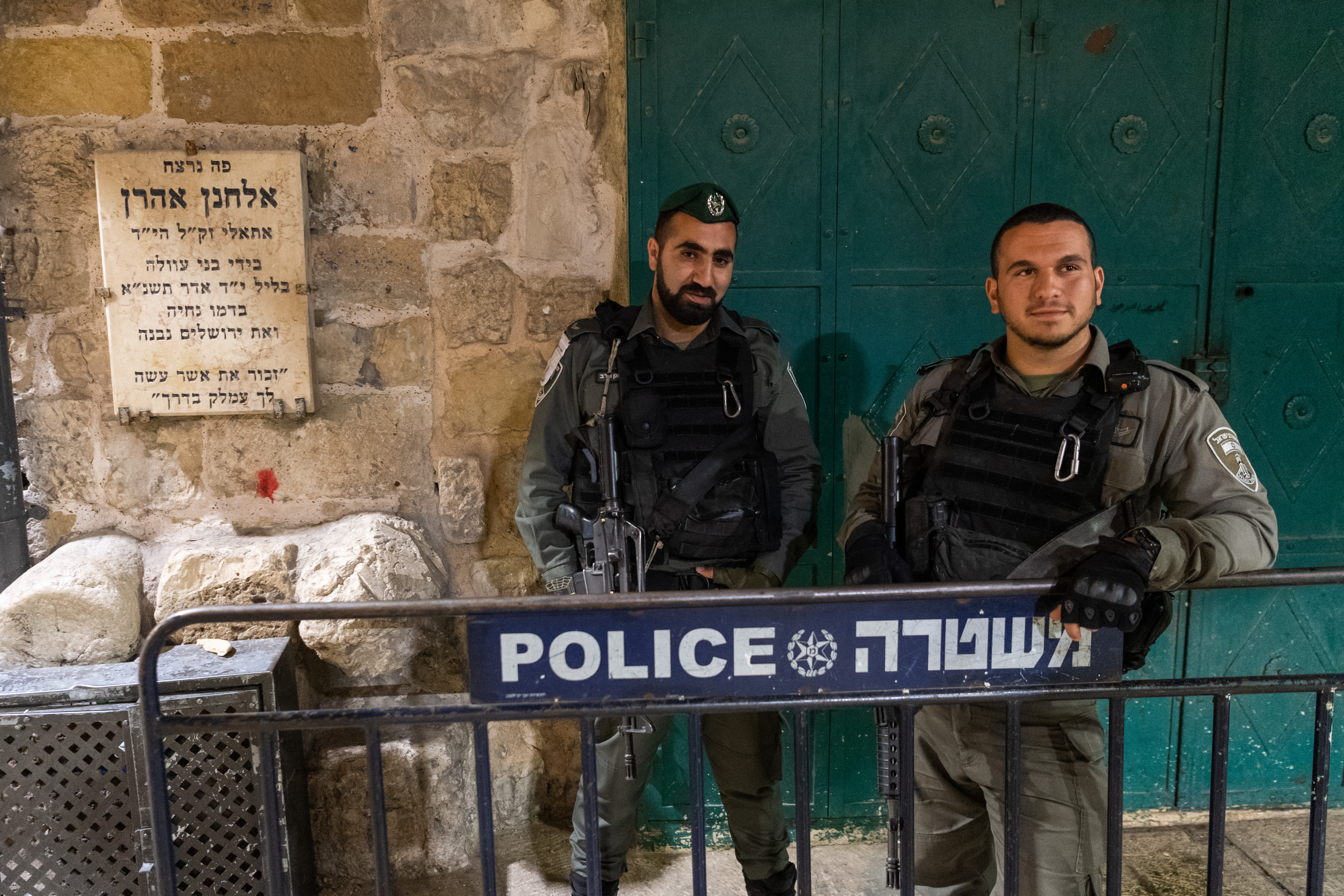
Magavniks in the Muslim Quarter of Jerusalem's Old City.

The Border Police is composed of professional officers on payroll and field policemen redirected from the IDF (at age 18, Israelis can choose to serve in the Border Police instead of the IDF). All border policemen are trained in combat, counter-terrorism, riot control, and police work. Outstanding officers can train as specialists, such as snipers, buggy-drivers, dog operators, or bomb squad members.

Because of their combat training, border police are employed in areas with greater risk of riots, violence and terror. They serve mainly in the countryside, in Arab villages and towns (along with the regular police), near the borders and in the West Bank.

=== Settlements security ===
The Border Police is also responsible for security of rural settlements inside Israel with its Rural Police (Hebrew: שיטור כפרי, shitur kafri) units and Community Security Coordinators (Hebrew: רב"ש, rabash). Rural policemen are full-time professional officers and security coordinators are a mixture of full-time and volunteer officers.

=== Special Operations Units ===
The Border Police has four Special forces units:

==== Yamam ====
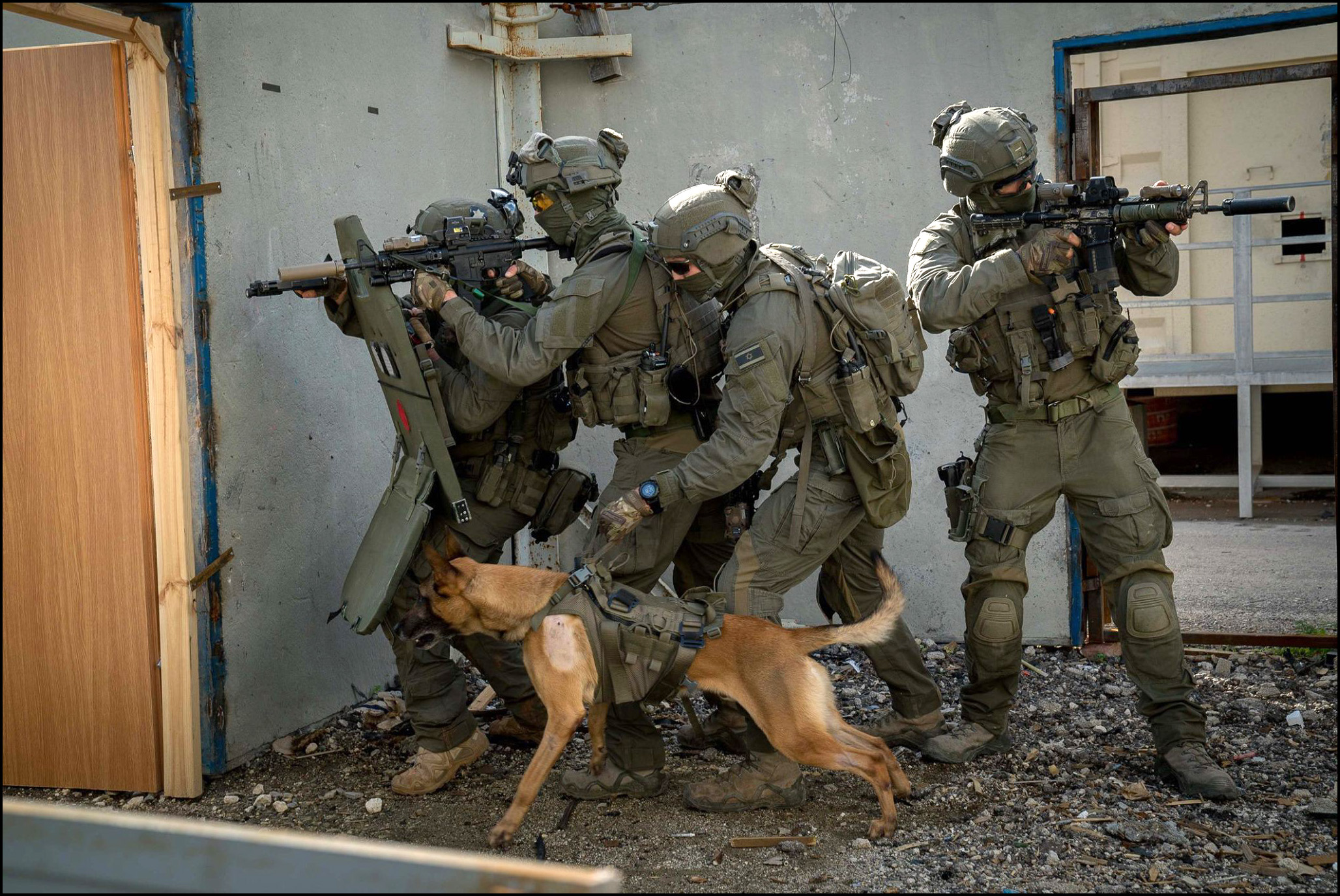
YAMAM operators

The Yamam (Hebrew: ימ"מ, an acronym for Centralized Special Unit יחידה מרכזית מיוחדת, Yeḥida Merkazit Meyuḥedet), also called in Hebrew היחידה המיוחדת ללוחמה בטרור and Israel's National Counter Terror Unit (I.N.C.T.U.) in English, is Israel's national counter-terrorism unit. The Yamam is capable of both hostage-rescue operations and offensive takeover raids against terrorist targets in civilian areas. Besides military and counter-terrorism duties, it also performs SWAT duties and undercover police work. The unit operates snipers, police dog (K9) handlers, rappelling teams, EOD experts, paramedics, and undercover operators.

YAMAM was formed in 1974 as a response to a wave of Palestinian terrorism. The unit has since carried out thousands of operations, killed hundreds of terrorists, and foiled countless terror attacks. It was awarded five citations of recommendation (Hebrew: צל"ש) from the Police Commissioner and one from the IDF Chief of general staff (Hebrew: צל"ש הרמטכ"ל).

==== Yamas ====
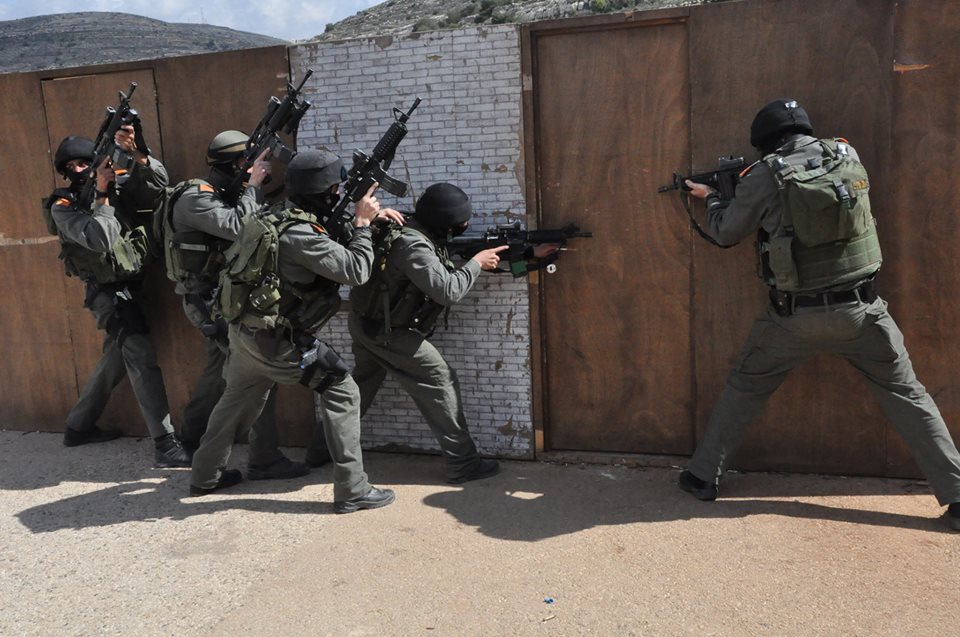
YAMAS in training

The Yamas is the undercover counter-terror unit.

The Yamas is often expected to carry out complex missions with little or no preparation, often involving daylight raids in volatile areas. It does not follow regular military or police command structure and answers directly to the Shabak. The IDF long denied its existence.

==== Others ====
- Samag (Tactical Counter-Crime and Counter-Terror Rapid Deployment Unit)
- Matilan (Intelligence Gathering and Infiltrations Interception Unit)

== Volunteer Border Guard ==
The Border Guard also deploys many volunteers. These members serve in regular Border Guard units. The Border Guard relies on volunteer soldiers to reinforce its manpower and help maintain Israel's security needs. The volunteer Border Guard are given special attention in sensitive places like Jerusalem where security threats are highest and sometimes double or even triple the manpower of full-time security forces in a given area.

Many of these special Border Guard volunteers are Jewish immigrants who immigrated to Israel from places like the United States, United Kingdom, Canada, Australia, Italy, France, Germany, South Africa, South America, and the former Soviet Union.

Volunteer Border Guard members leave behind jobs and families on a regular basis to serve in this combat unit. Some come from cities like Beit Shemesh, Ofrah, Ashkelon, Ra'anana and Haifa. They are not paid for serving in the Border Guard and serve in their spare time.

== Commanders ==
Below is a list of current and former Border Police commanders.

- Pinchas Kopel (1953–1964) He later was the third police commissioner.
- Shimon Eshed (1964–1972) Later he was commander of the Northern District.
- Chaim Levi (1972–1976) Later he was the Prison Service Commissioner.
- Zvi Bar (1976–1983) Later he was the head of the Police Operations Branch and served as mayor of Ramat Gan.
- Pinchas Shahar (1983–1989) awarded the excellence medal.
- Meshulam Amit (1989–1993) He was briefly deputy mayor of Jerusalem and was a candidate for the Knesset on behalf of the Moledet party.
- Yitzhak Aharonovich (1993–1995) Later on, Cohen was commander of the SJ District, commander of the Southern District and the commissioner of police. He also was Minister of Public Security on behalf of the Yisrael Beiteinu party.
- Israel Sadan (1998–1995) Later he was mayor of Hadera.
- Yitzhak Dadon (1998–2001) The service decoration.
- Yaakov Ganot (2001–2002) Later he was the Commissioner of Prisons. He is CEO of the Airports Authority.
- David Tzur (2002–2004) Later he was commander of the Tel Aviv District. He also was a member of the Knesset on behalf of the Hatnua party.
- Hossein Fares (2004–2007) The first Druze head of the Israel Police.
- Israel Isaac (2007–2011) Later he was the Israel Police commissioner.
- Yoram Halevy (2011–2012) Later he was commander of the Southern District, now commander of the Jerusalem District.
- Amos Jacob (2012–2016) Commander of the Hof District.
- Kobi Shabtai (2016–2021) awarded the excellence medal
- Amir Cohen (2021–2023)

== Ranks ==
Border Police ranks are the same as those of the Israel Police and are similarly sworn in: the ranks of police officers and junior officers on the shirt collar, ranks of officers and senior officers on the cover. But in field uniforms, Border Police officers wear rank insignia on a green background worn on epaulets on top of both shoulders or on green epaulets. Border Police branch insignia is worn on the cap or beret. Enlisted grades wear rank insignia on the sleeve, halfway between the shoulder and the elbow. The Border Police British Army style insignia are white with blue interwoven threads backed with the appropriate corps color.

Officers

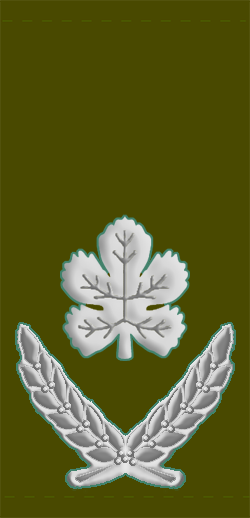
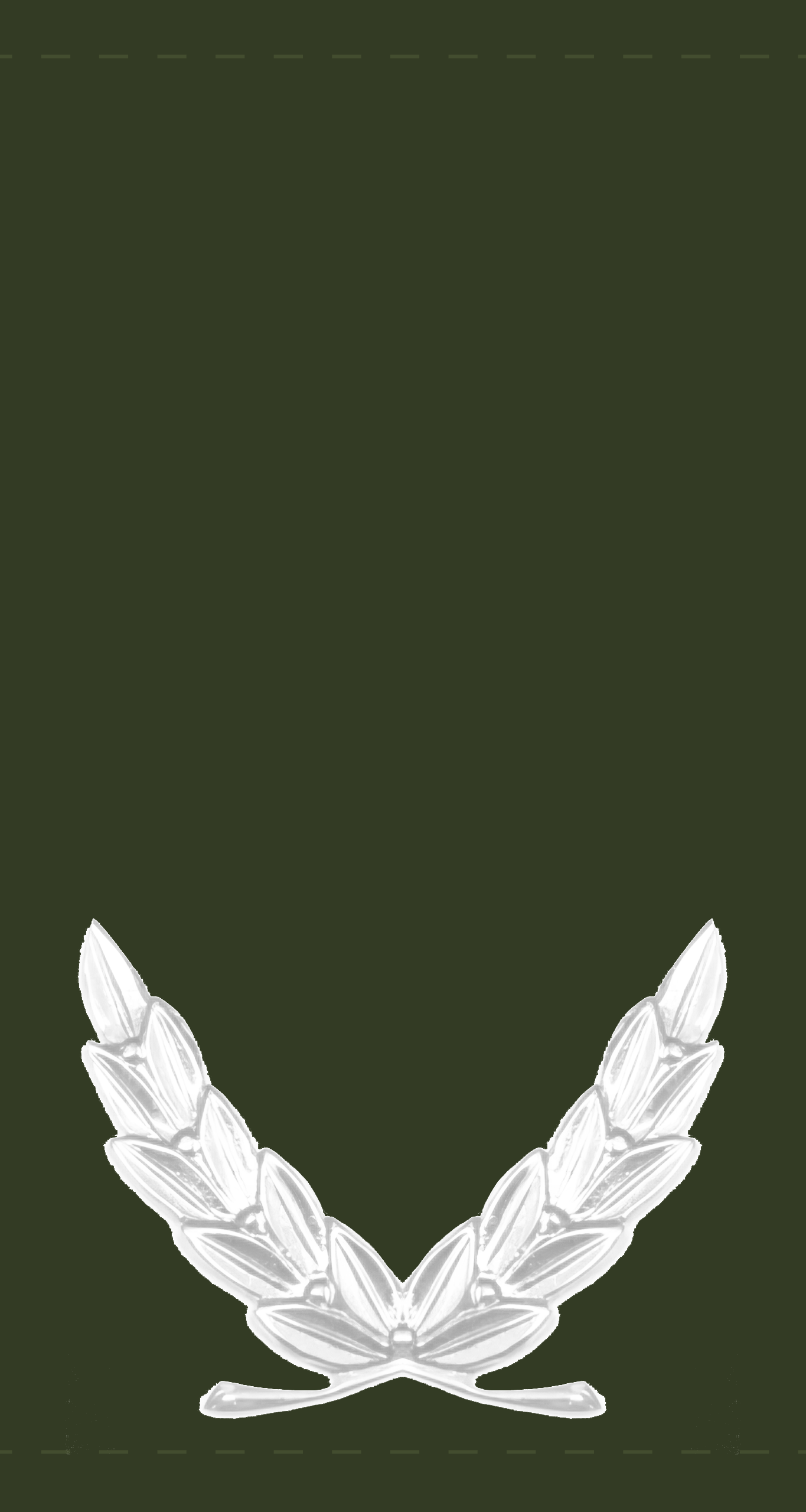
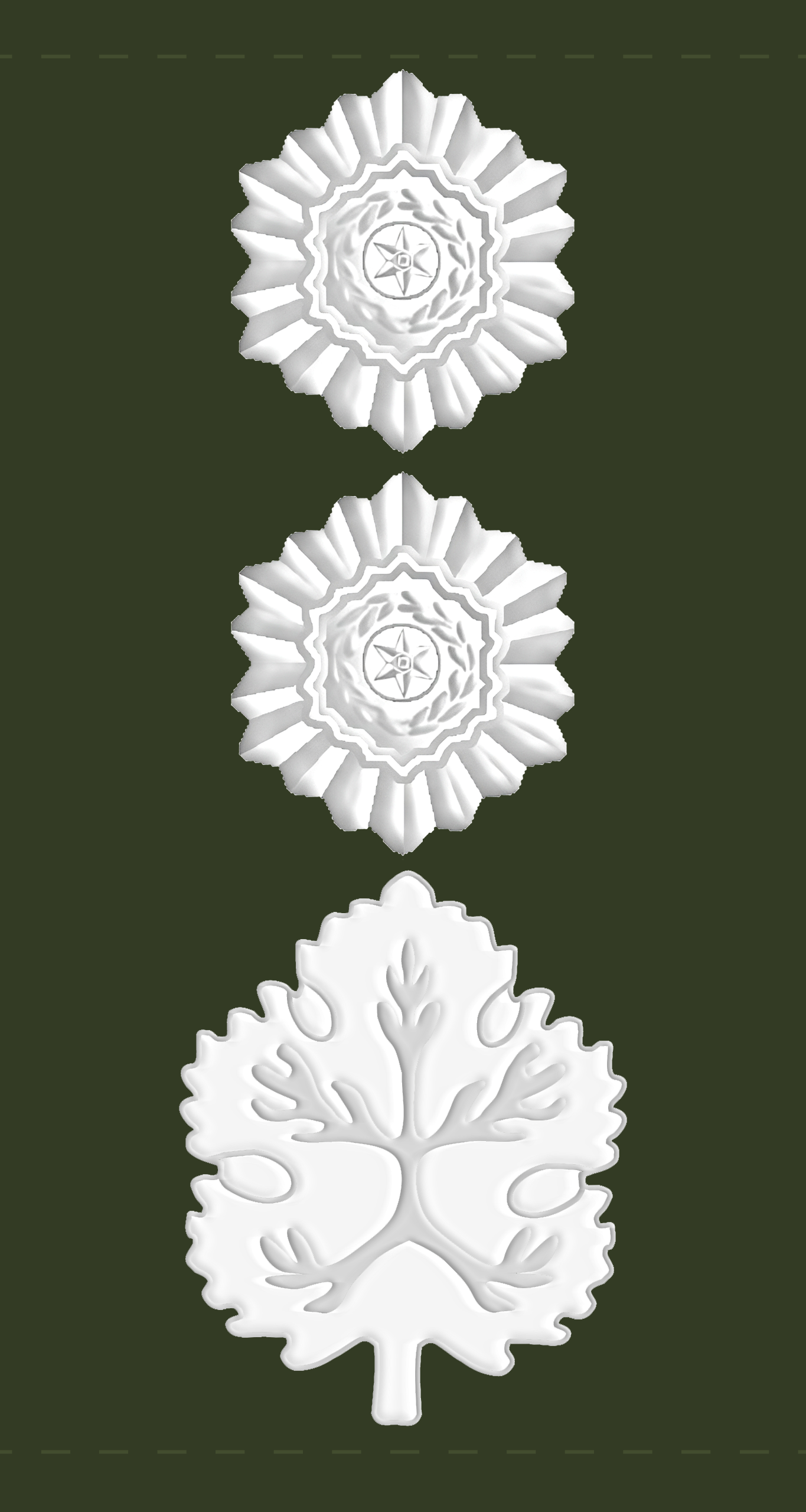
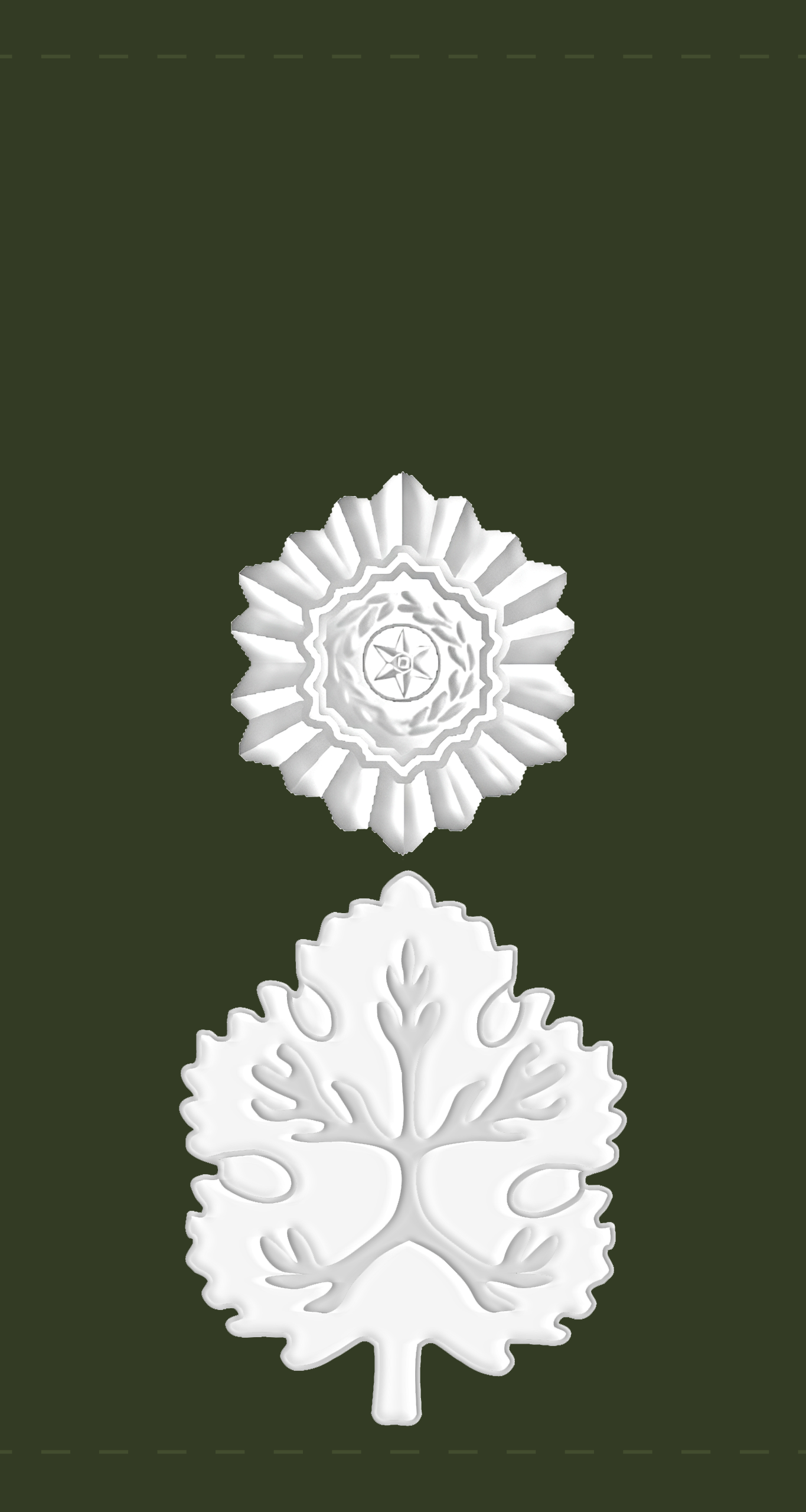
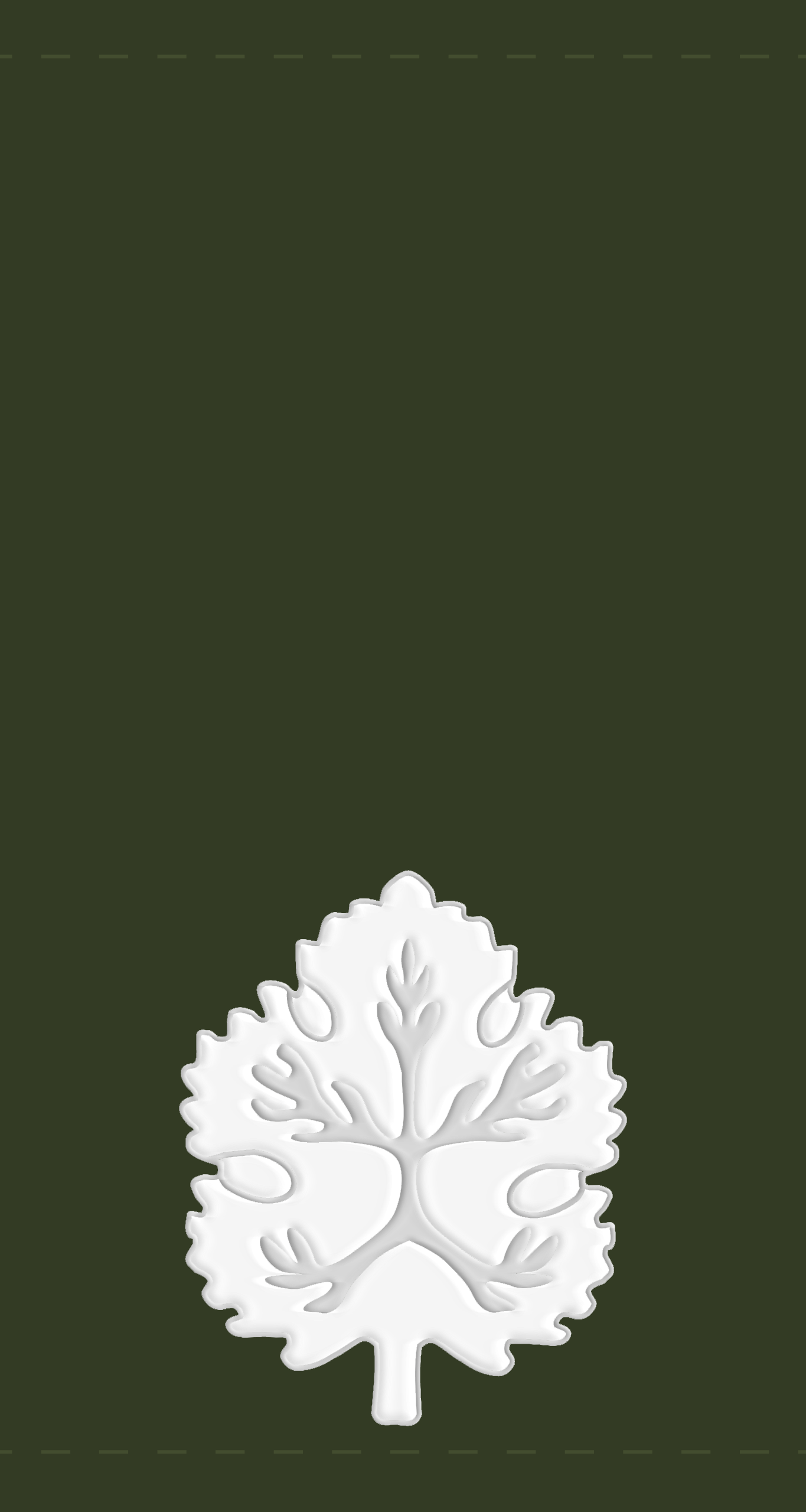
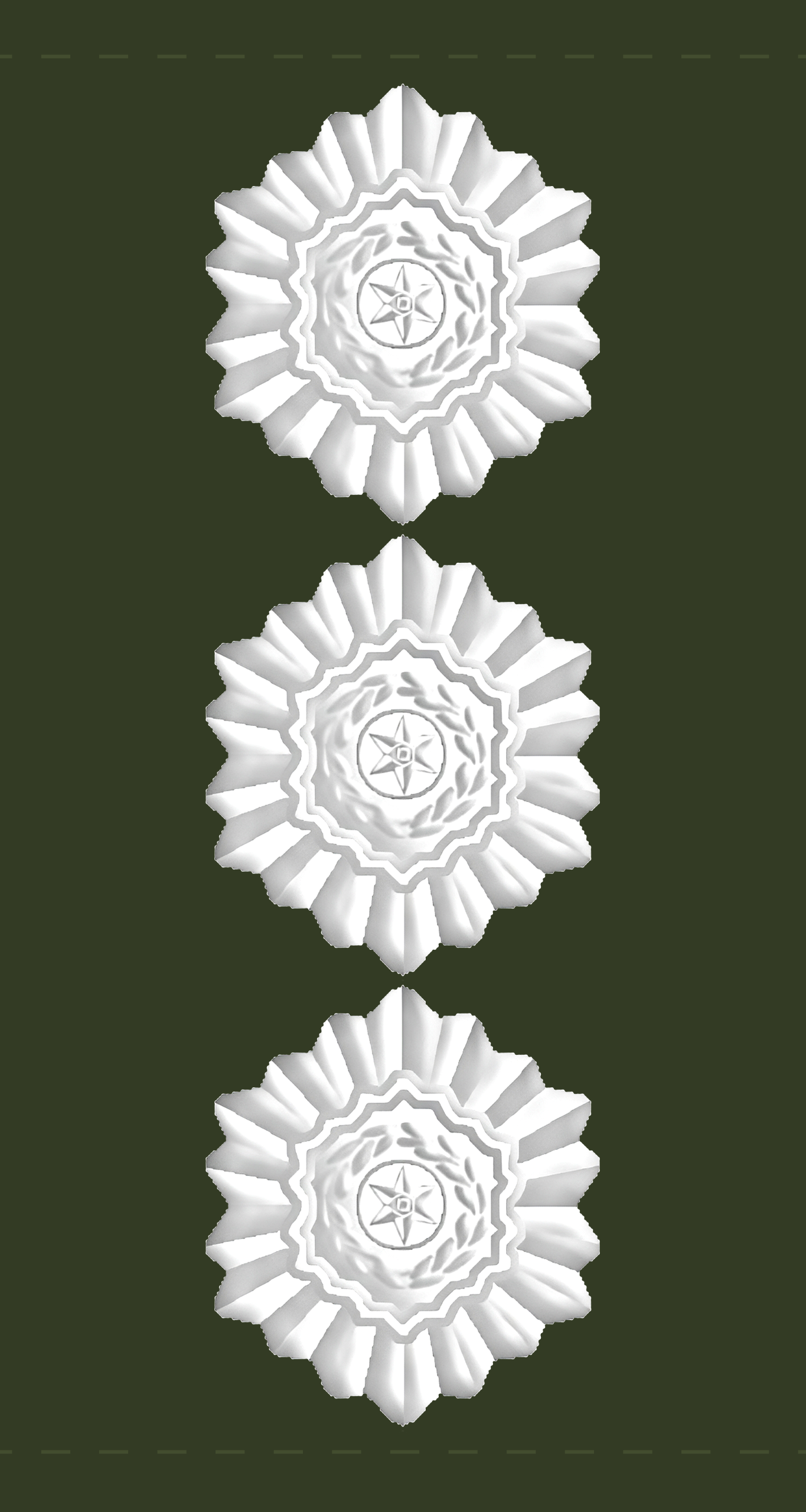
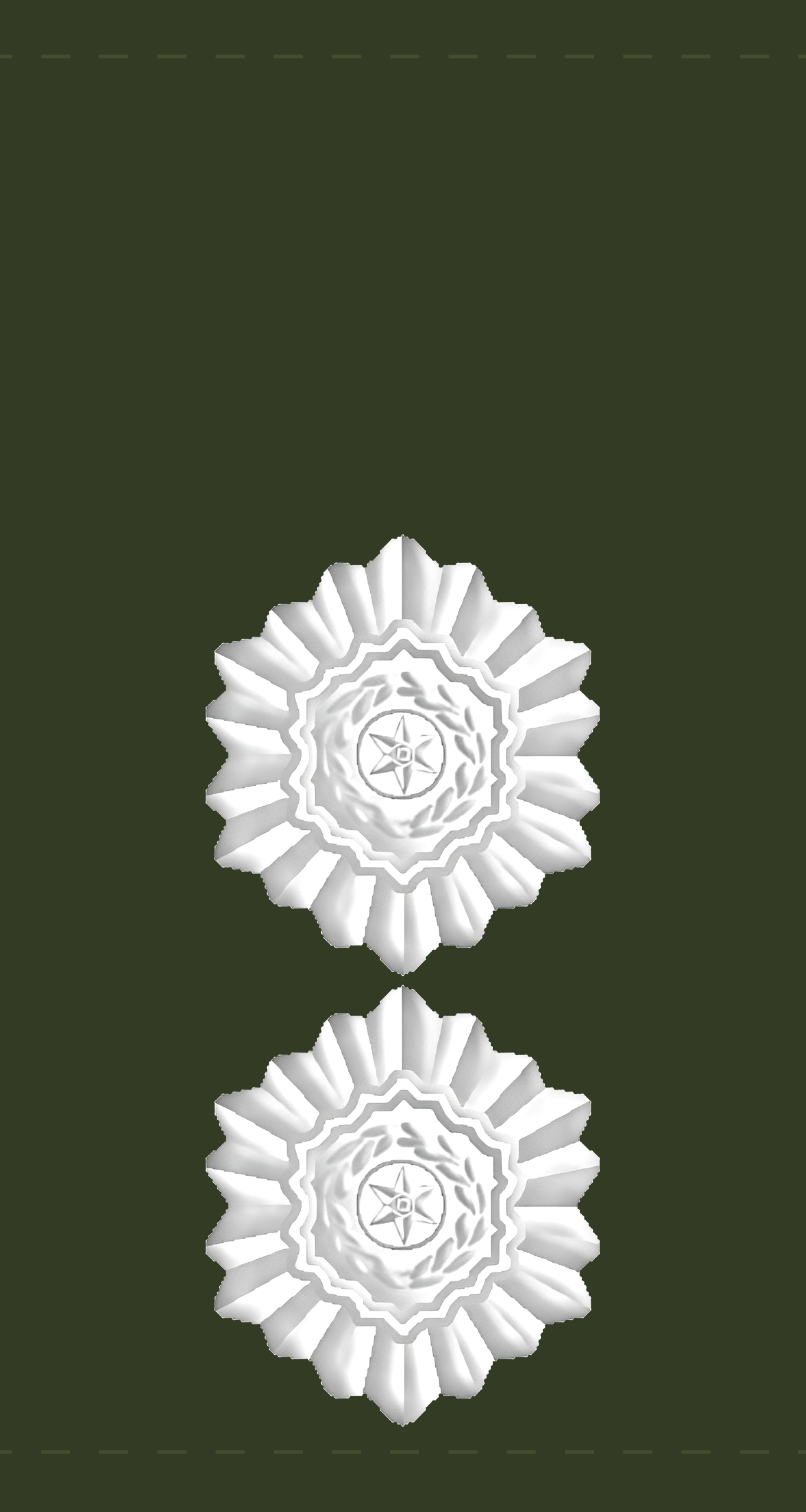
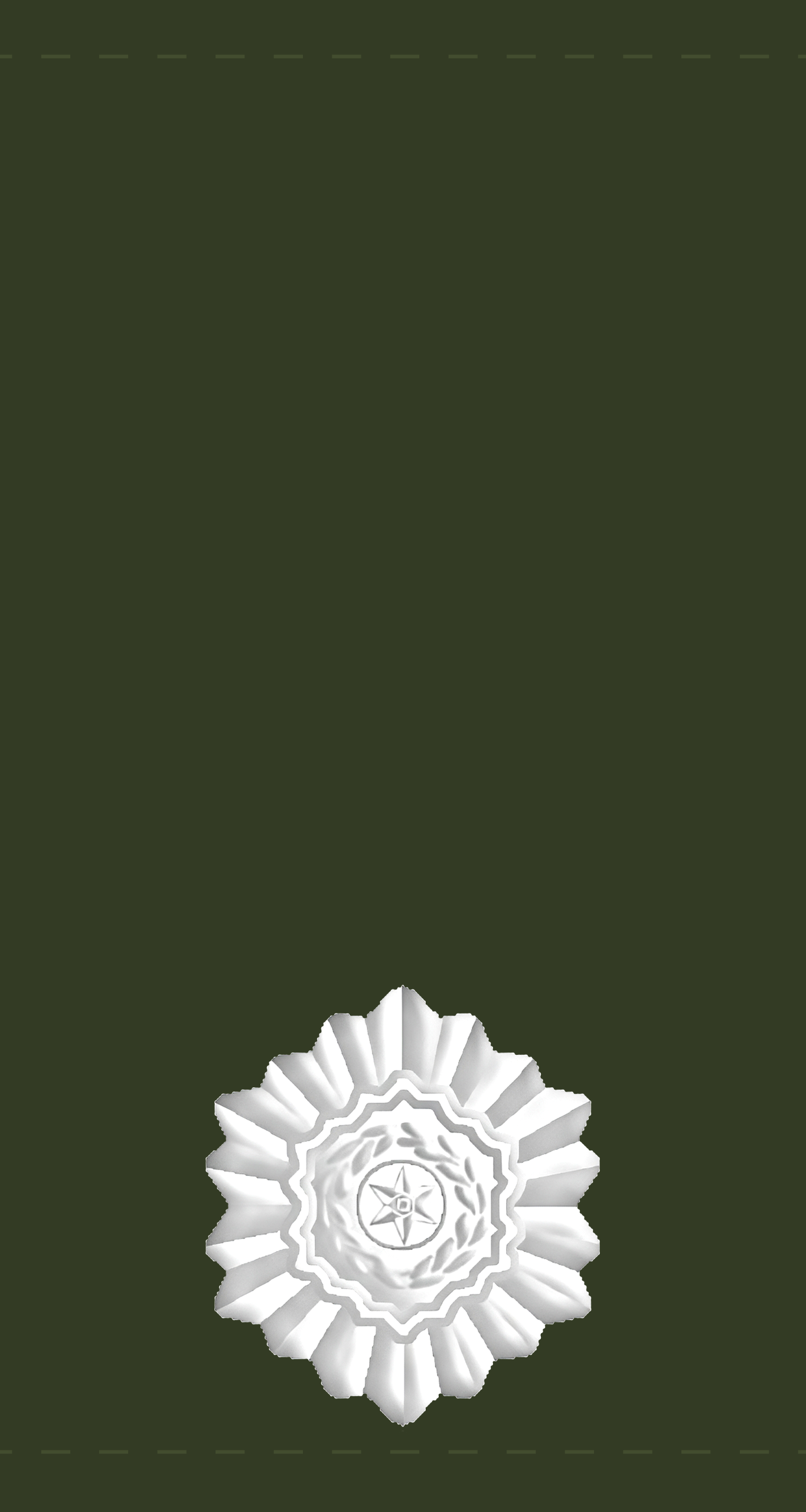
Rank group	General / flag officers		Senior officers			Junior officers
Israel Border Police
Israel Border Police	ניצב; Nitzav	תת ניצב; Tat nitzav	ניצב משנה; Nitzav mishneh	סגן ניצב; Sgan nitzav	רב פקד; Rav pakad	פקד; Pakad	מפקח; Mefake'ah	מפקח משנה; Mefake'ah mishneh
English	Deputy commissioner	Assistant commissioner	Commander	Chief superintendent	Superintendent	Chief inspector	Inspector	Sub-inspector

Officer cadets

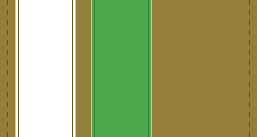
Israel Border Police
Israel Border Police	צוער; Tzoar
English	Officer cadet

Others

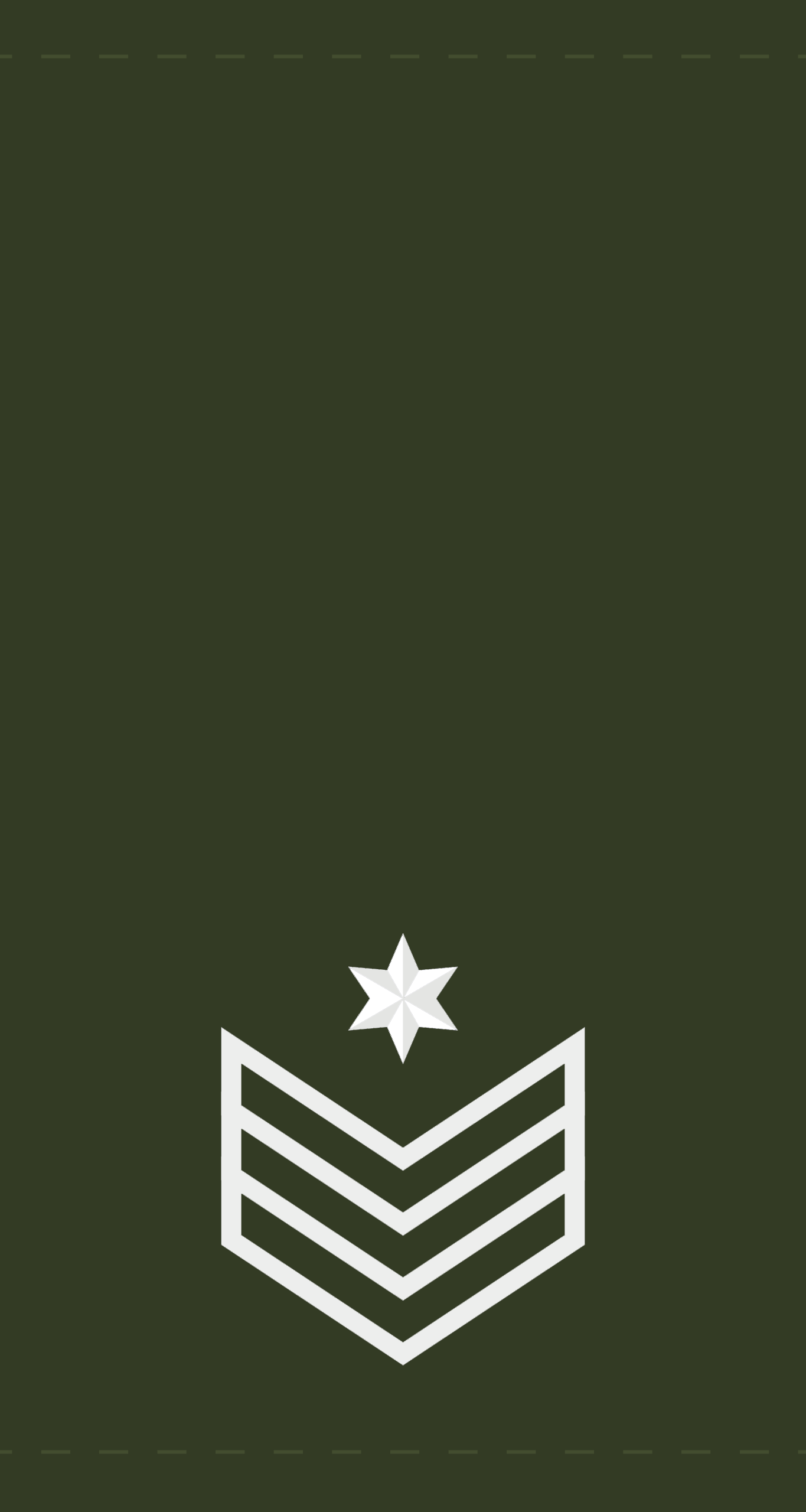
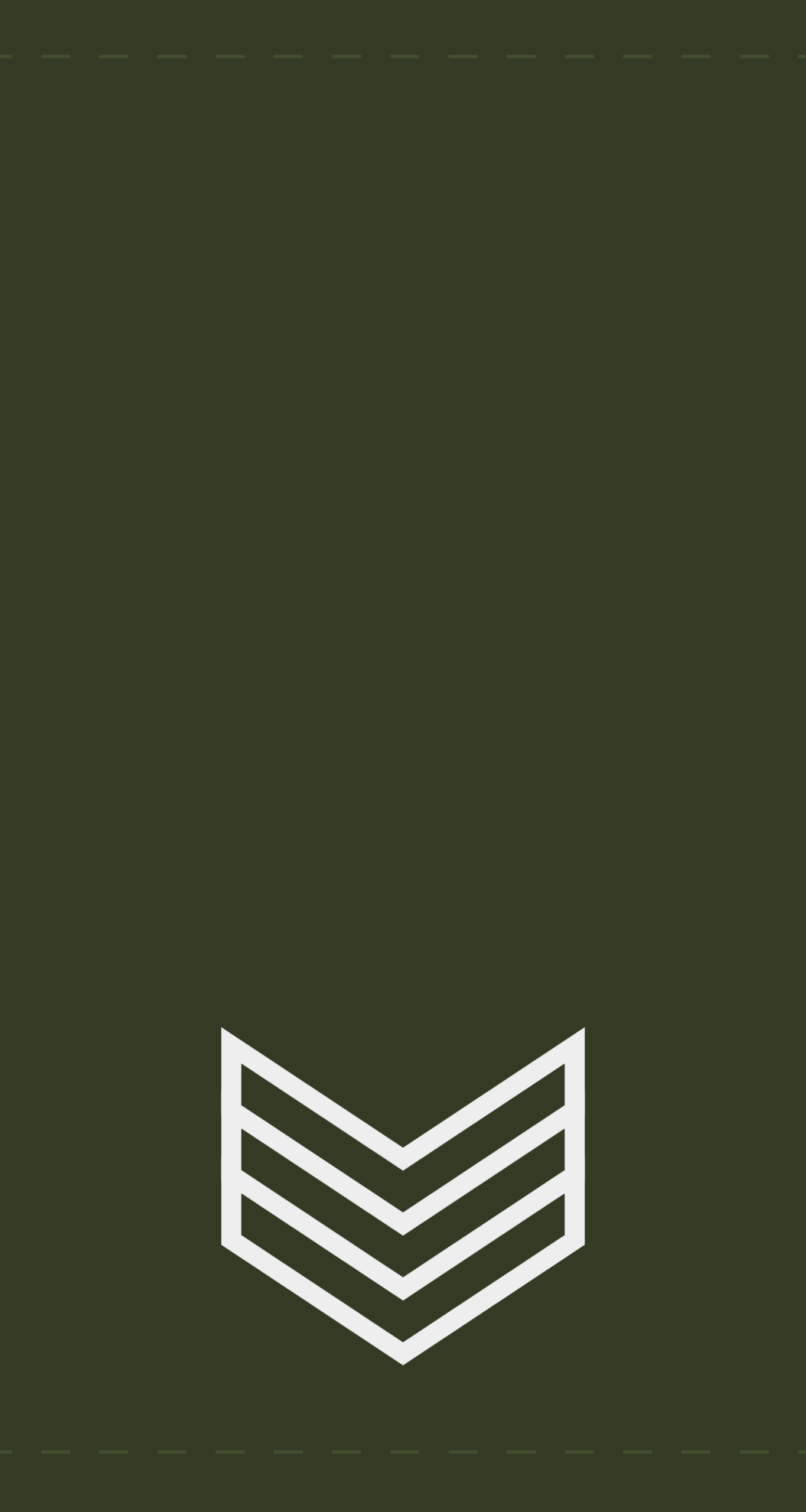
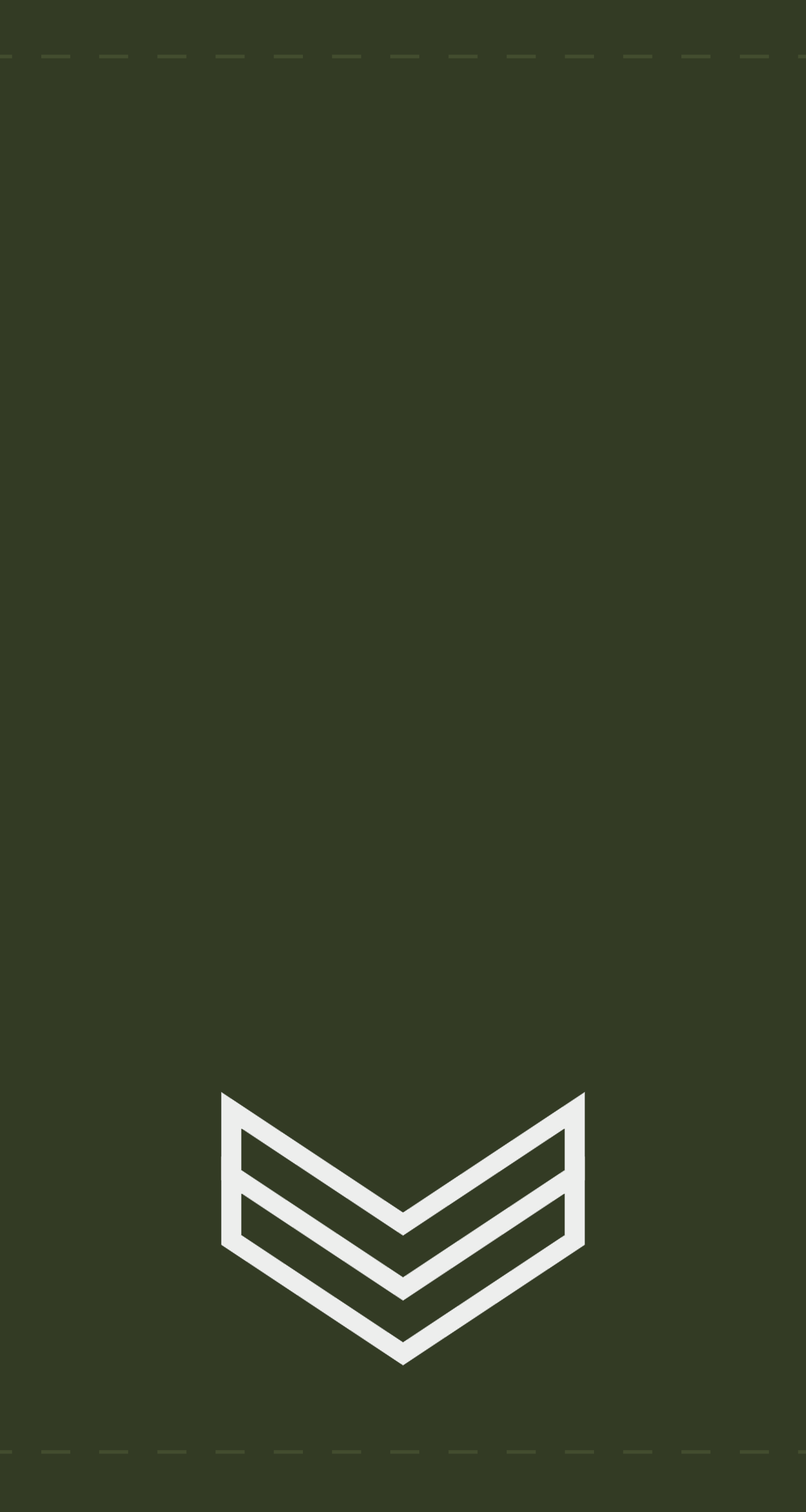
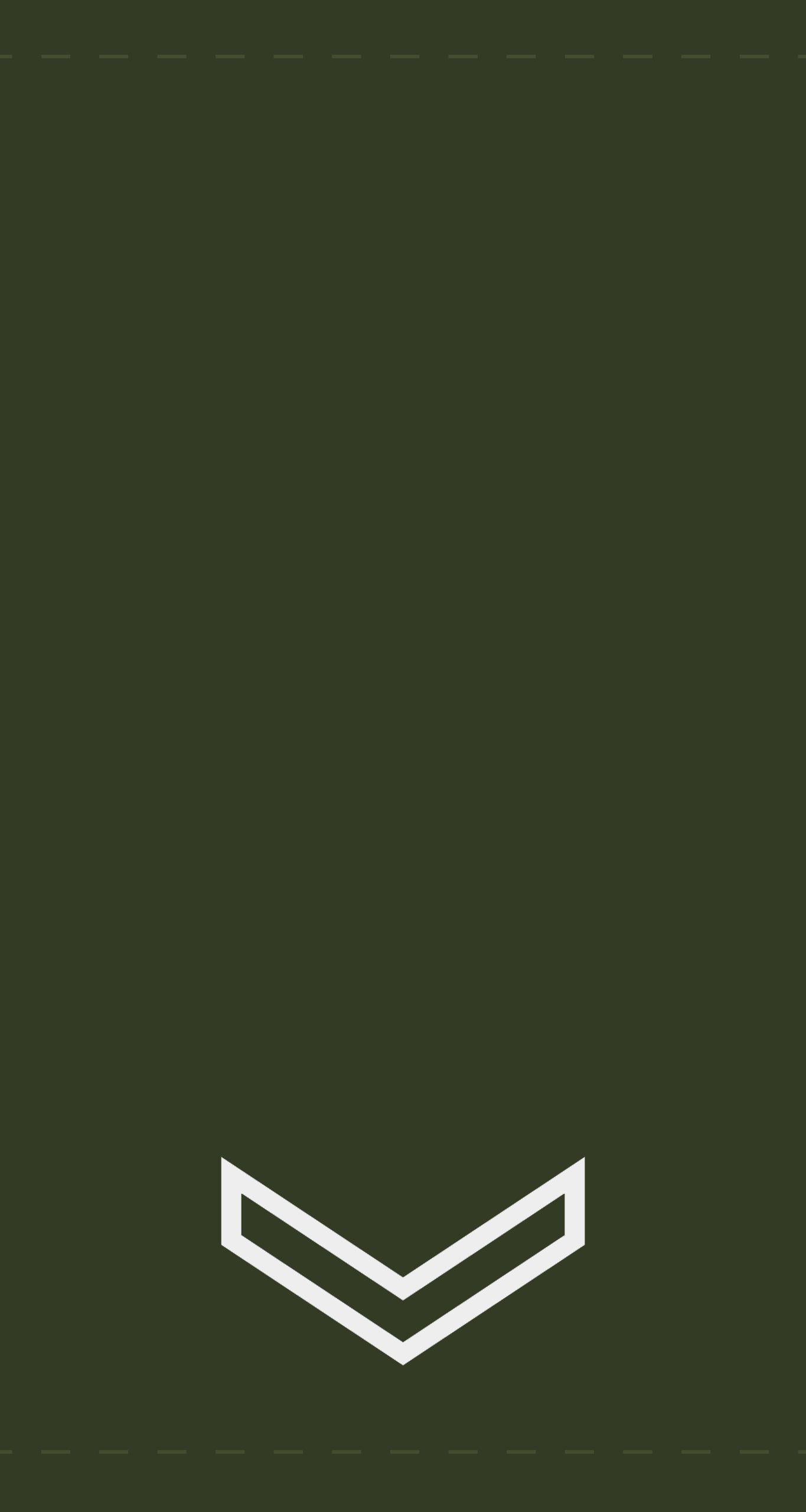
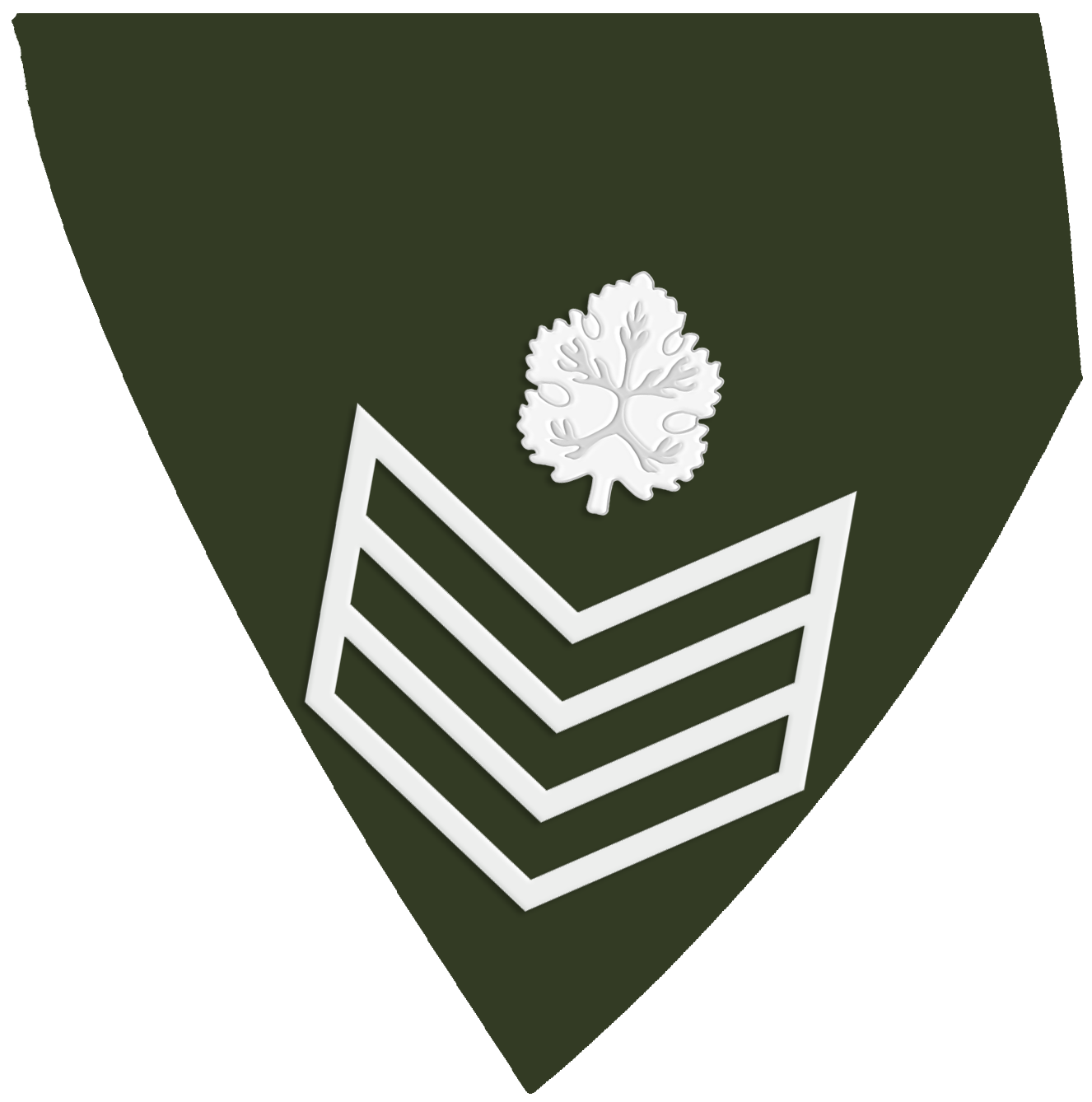
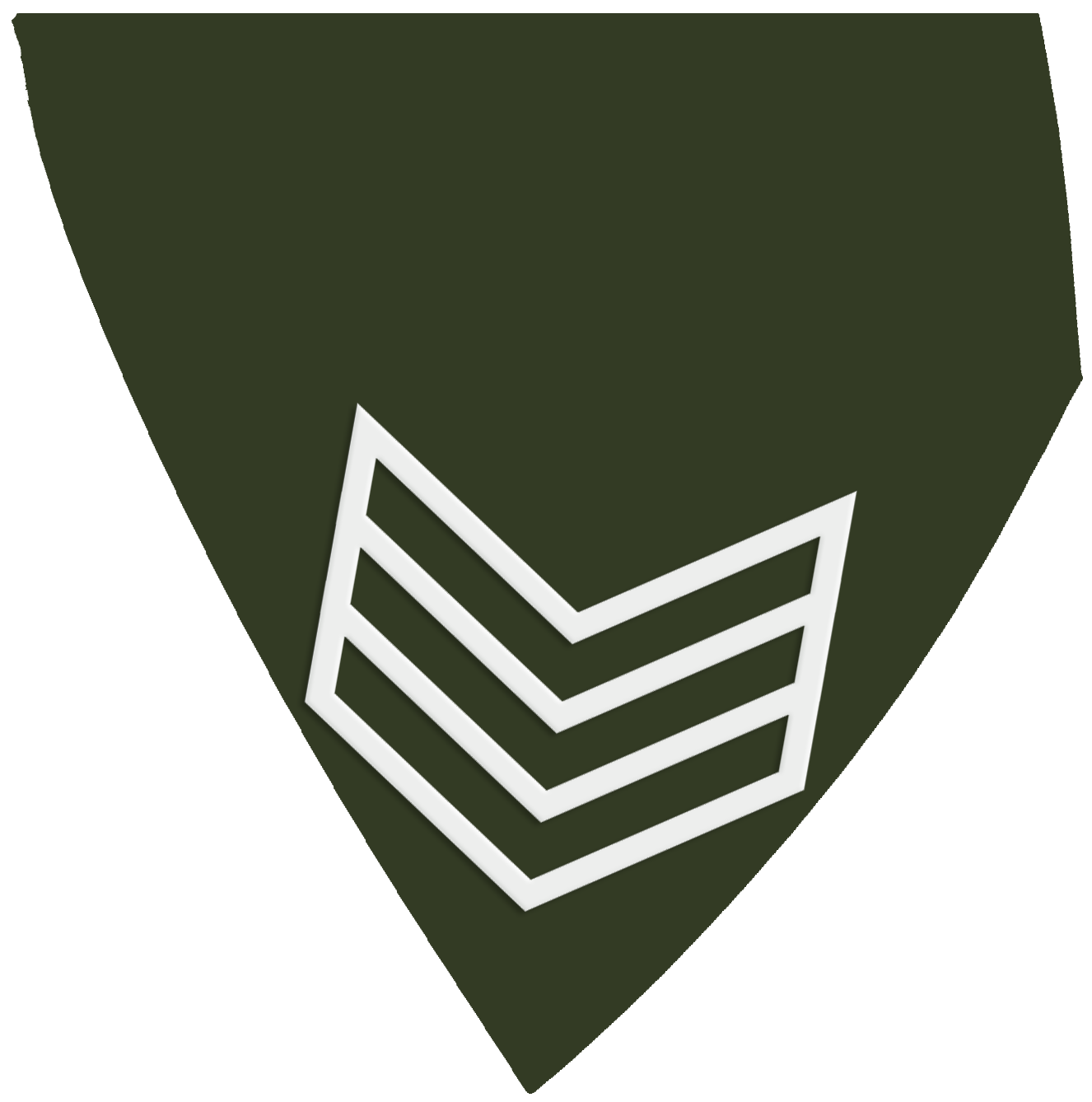
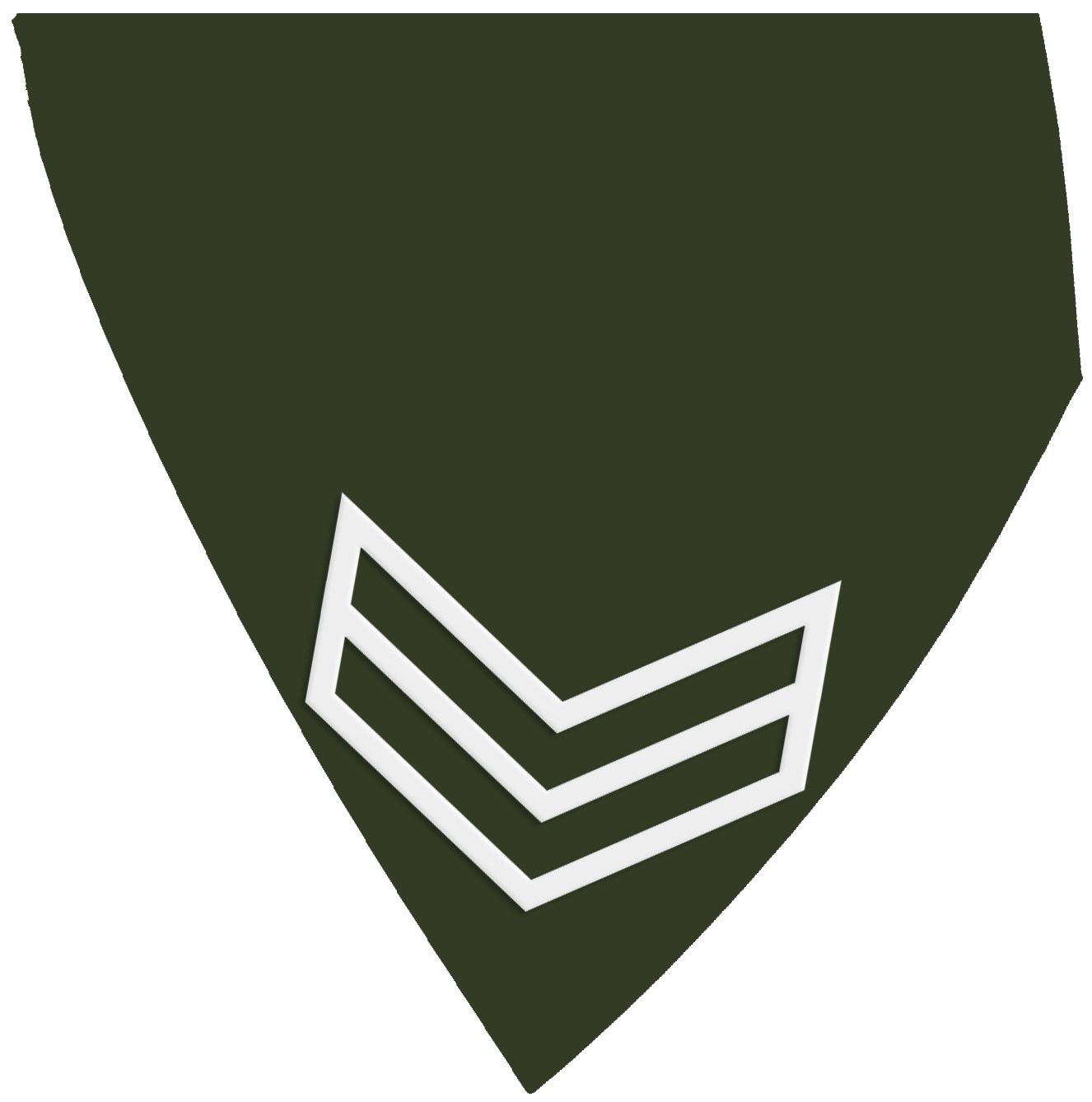
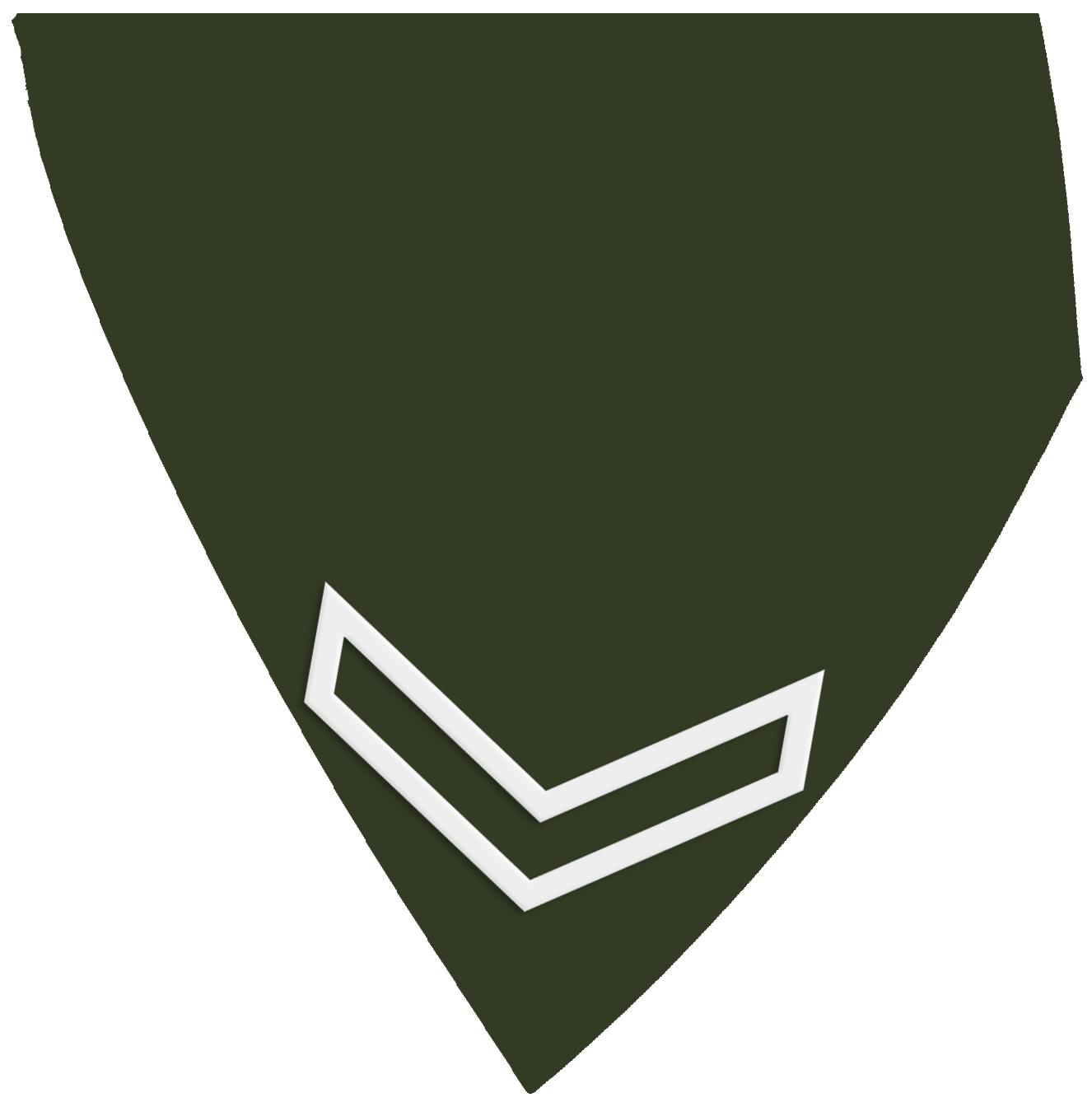
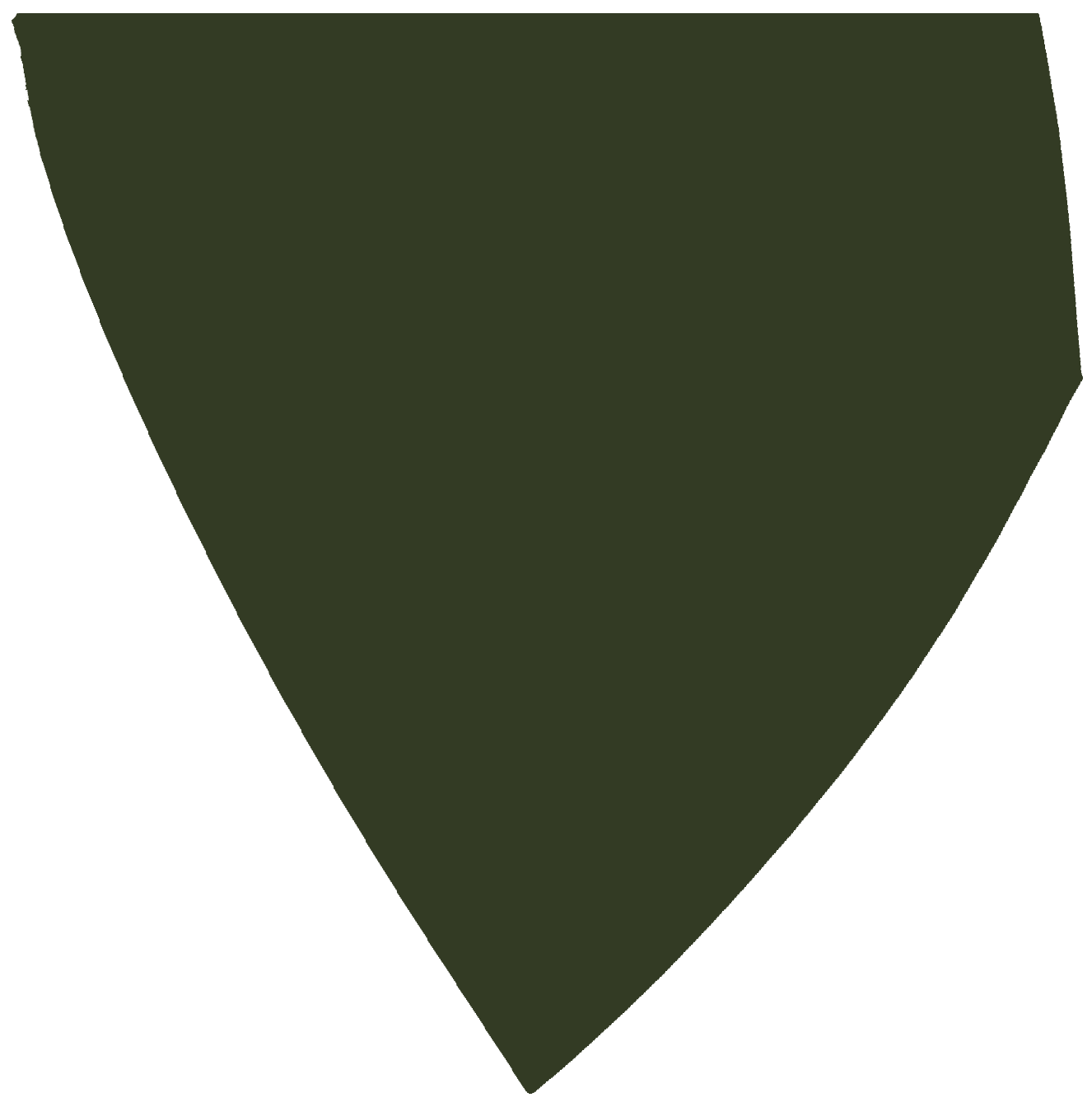
Rank group	Senior NCOs							Junior NCOs	Enlisted
Israel Border Police
Israel Border Police	רב נגד; Rav nagad	רב סמל בכיר; Rav samal bakhir	רב סמל מתקדם; Rav samal mitkadem	רב סמל ראשון; Rav samal rishon	רב סמל; Rav samal	סמל ראשון; Samal rishon	סמל שני; Samal sheni	רב שוטר; Rav shoter	שוטר; Shoter
English	Station sergeant major	Sergeant major	First sergeant	Master sergeant	Sergeant first class	Staff sergeant	Sergeant	Corporal	Constable

== Uniforms ==
The Border has several types of uniforms:

- Service dress (מדי אלף Madei Alef – Uniform "A") – the everyday uniform which is a grey variant of the khaki Navy and Air Corps uniform. A green lanyard is worn on the left shoulder with the Class A uniform
- Field dress ( מדי ב Madei Bet – Uniform "B") – worn into combat, training, work on base.

The first two resemble each other but the Madei Alef is made of higher quality materials in grey while the madei bet is in grey drab.

- Officers / Ceremonial dress (מדי שרד madei srad) – worn by officers, or during special events/ceremonies. Consists of a light yellow shirt and brown-gray trousers.

The service uniform for all Border Police personnel is grey. The uniforms consist of a two-pocket shirt, plain or combat trousers, sweater, jacket or blouse, and shoes or boots. The grey fatigues are the same for winter and summer and heavy winter gear is issued as needed. Women's dress parallels the men's but may substitute a skirt for the trousers and/or a blouse for the shirt.

Headgear included a service cap for dress and semi-dress and a field cap or bush hat worn with fatigues. Border Police personnel generally wear green berets in lieu of the service cap.

Some units have small variations in their uniforms such as certain Security and Tactical units in Jerusalem who wear the standard IDF olive fatigues.

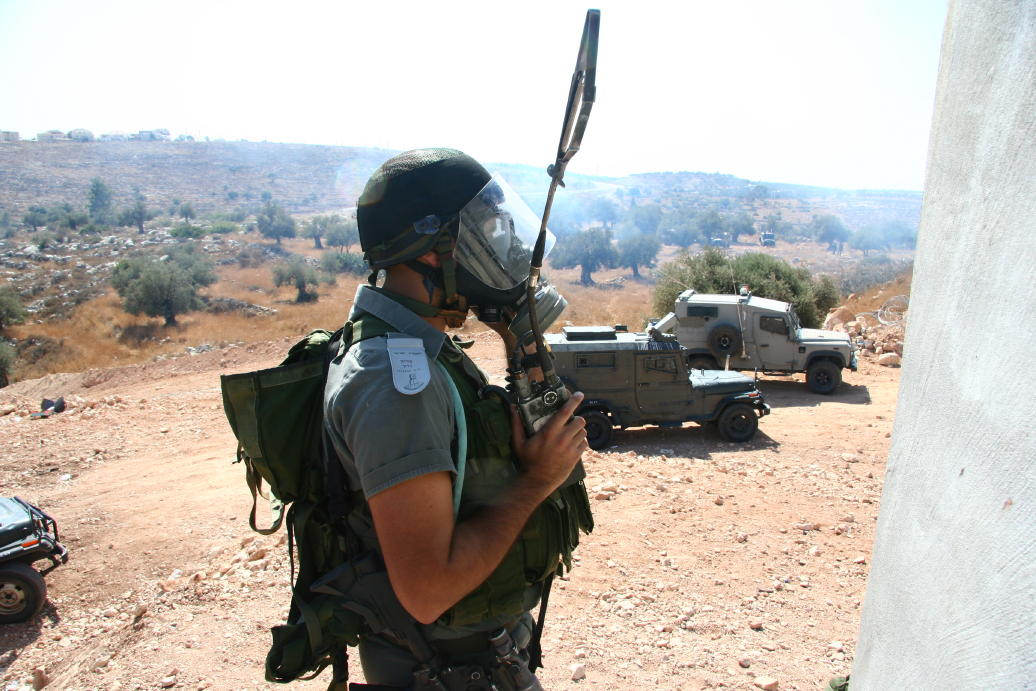
A border police officer with a tear gas mask.

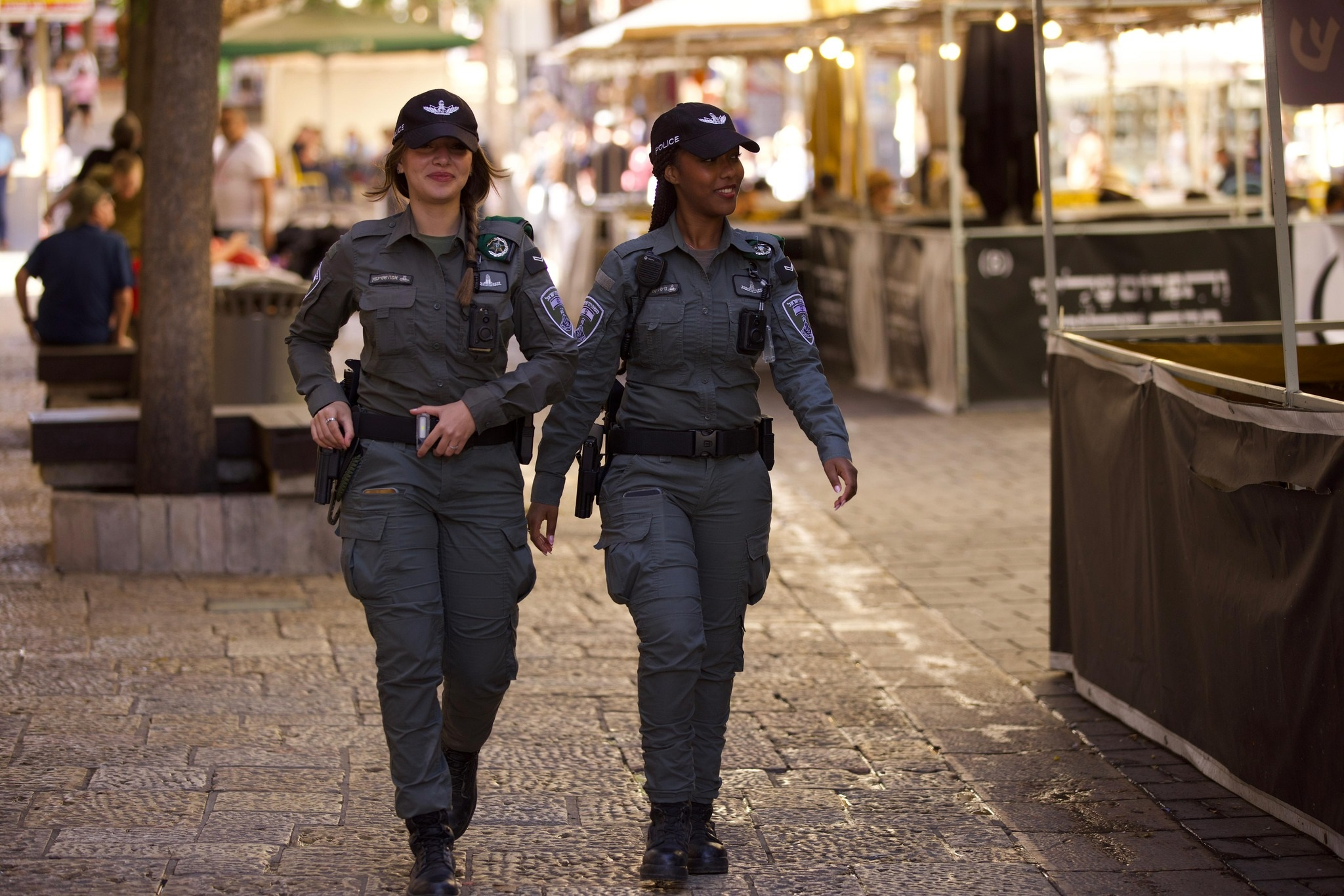
Border police officers on patrol in Jerusalem.

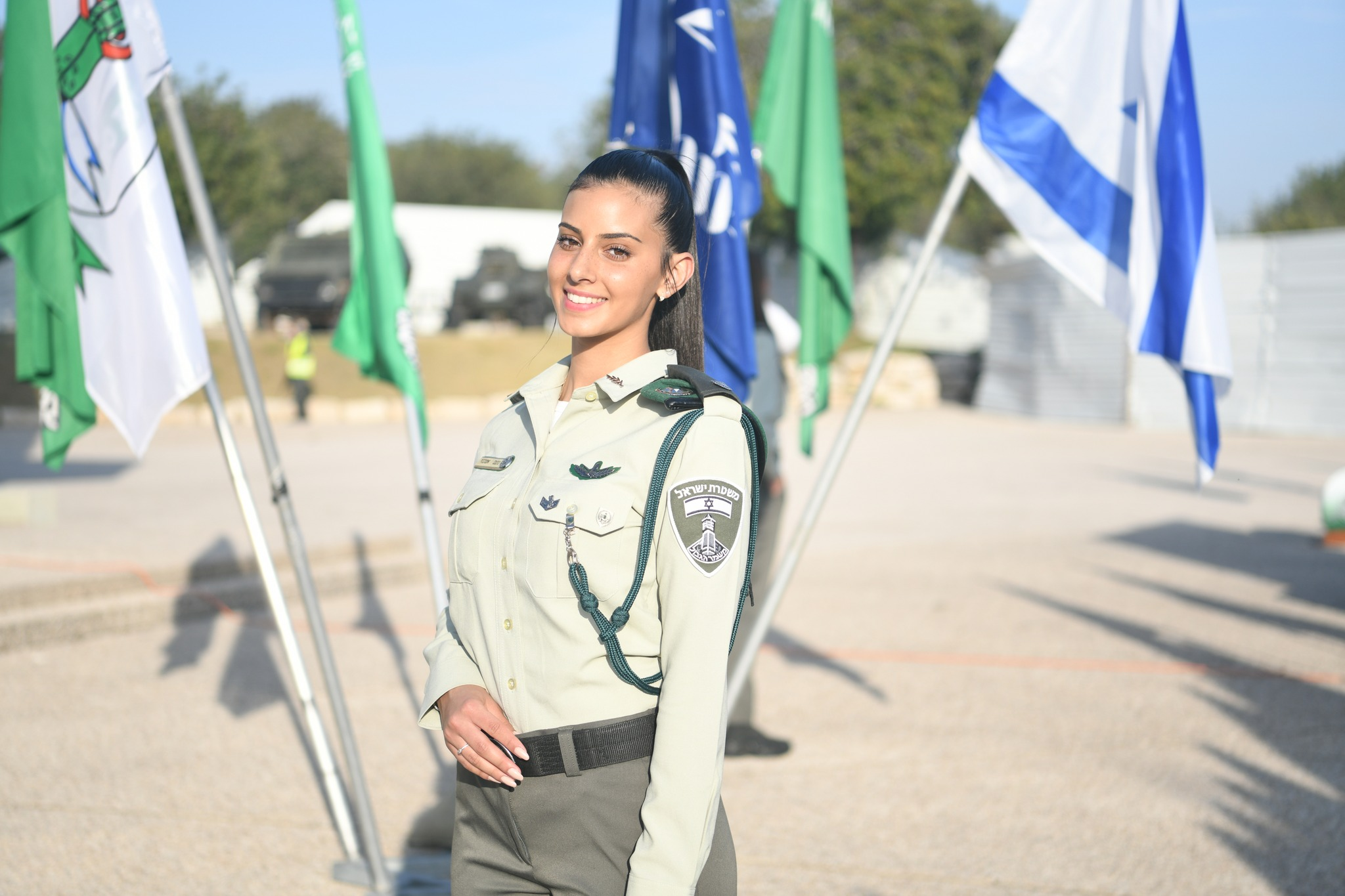
Border policewoman wears the Madei Srad.

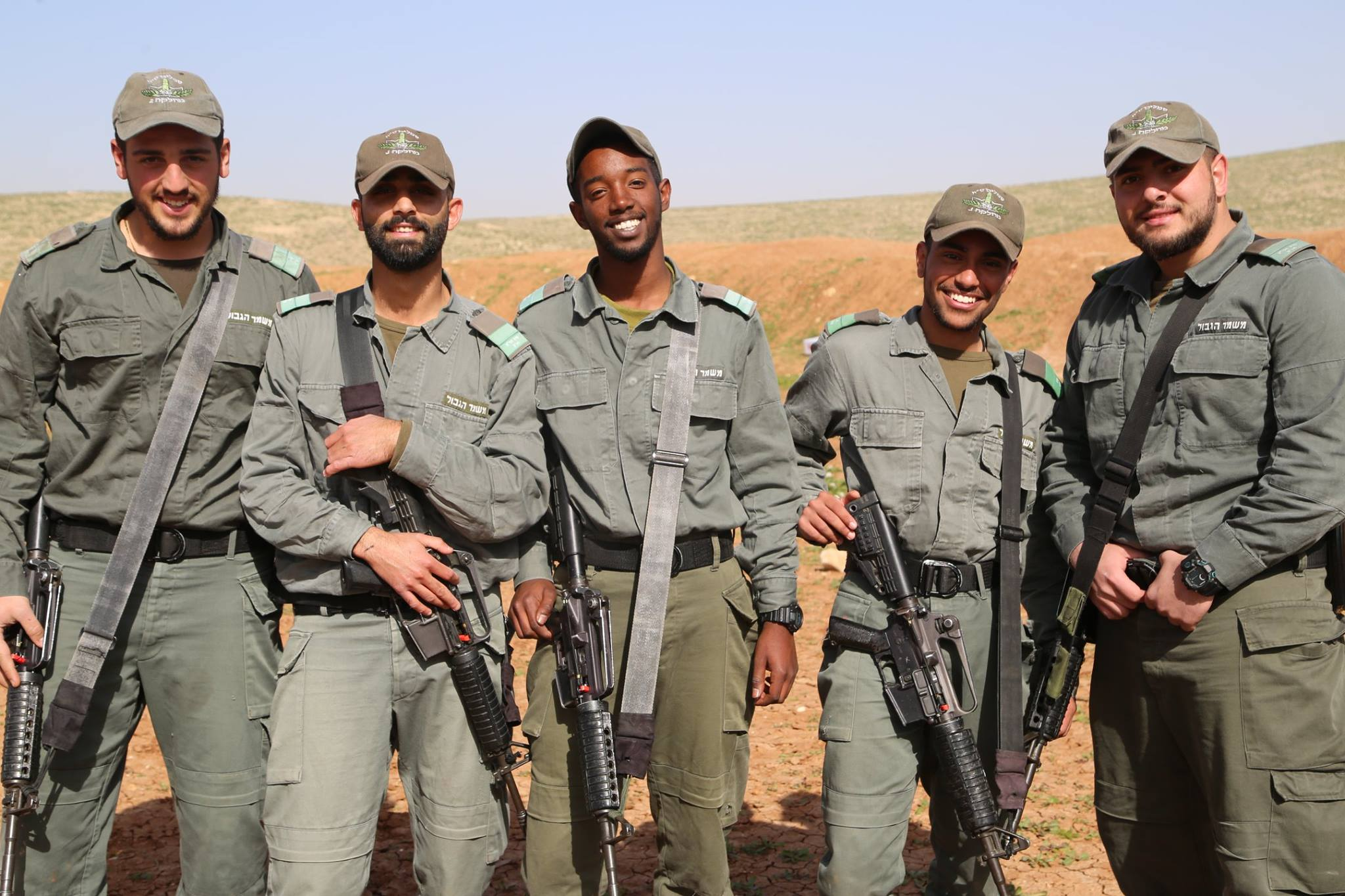
Border police officers wearing Madei Bet.

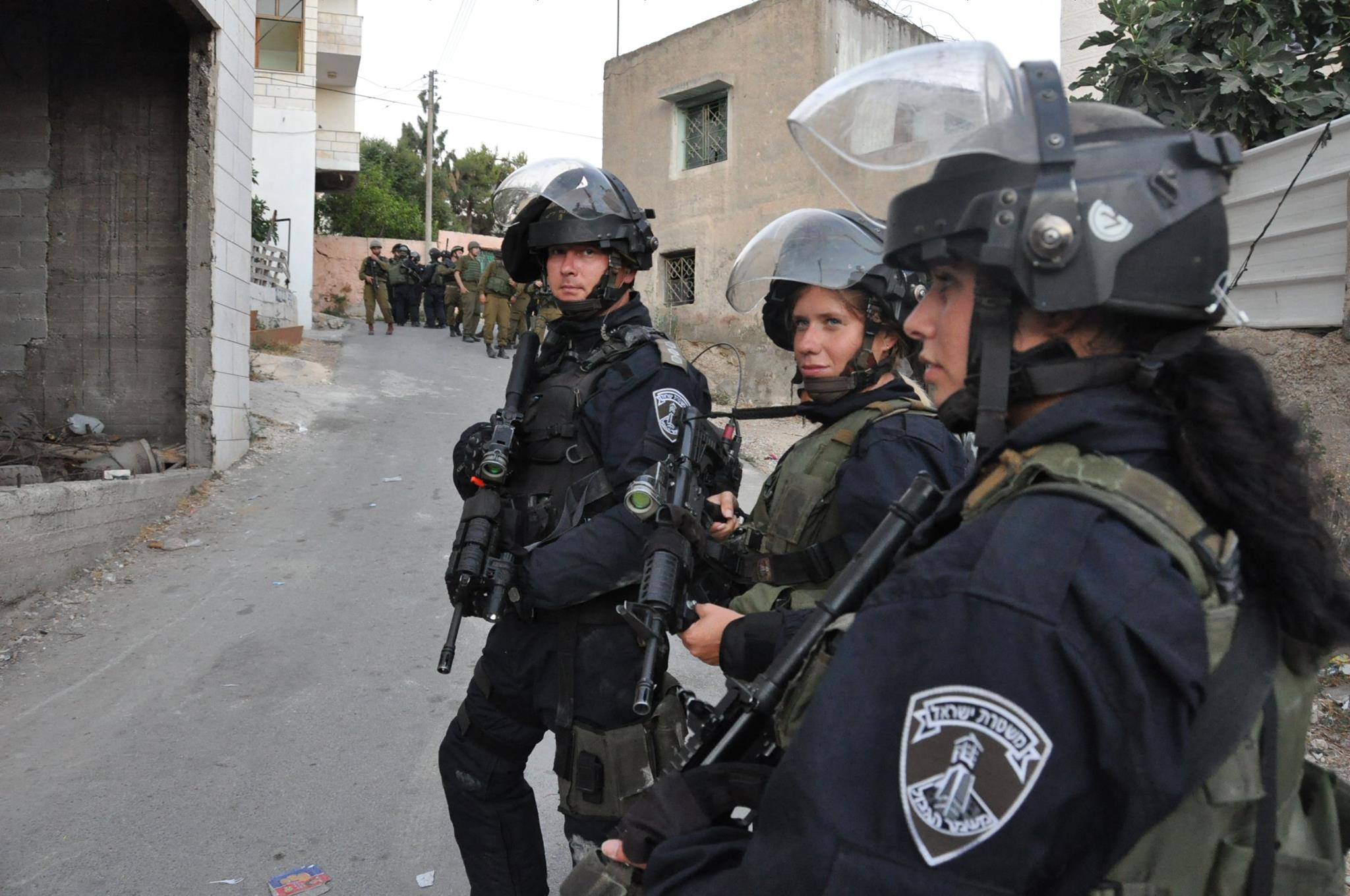
Border police officers in blue jumpsuit.

== Weapons and equipment ==
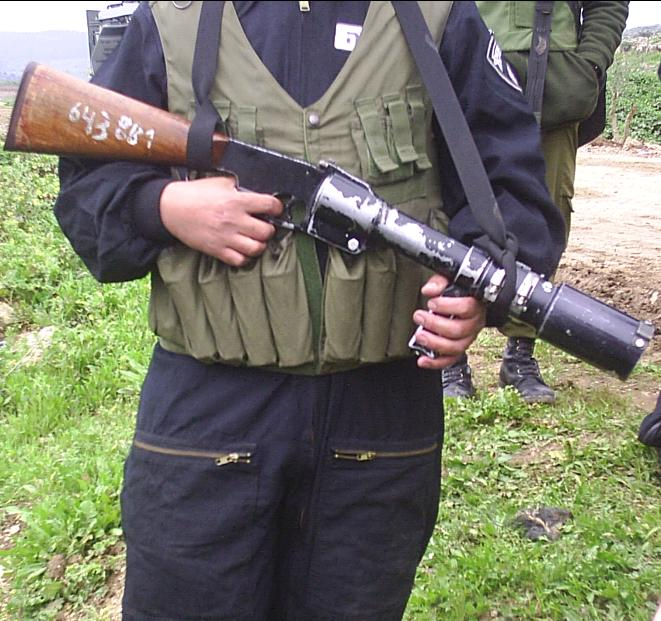
An Israeli Border Guard with a Federal M201-Z riot gas gun

The primary Border Police weapons are the CAR-15 and M-16 rifles, some of which are attached to the M-203 grenade launcher. The Border Police also use standard IDF equipment such as vests and helmets. Special units of Border Police use Glock 17, Glock 19, Jericho, or FN HP pistols. Some units, such as the Jerusalem Patrol Unit, carry the Beretta M9-22LR .22LR pistol. Special units use a variety of other weapons, Ruger S22s, sniper rifles, submachine guns, and shotguns.

The Border Police extensively use riot dispersal means such as batons and shields, tear gas canisters, stun grenades, rubber bullets, and water cannons.

== Transportation ==
The Border Police use Toyota Hilux, Carkal, Dawid wheeled armored personnel carriers and a variety of patrol cars and vehicles. Several units use motorcycles and ATVs.

== Memorial ==
The Border Police Memorial and Heritage Center is in the western Carmel mountains near Zomet Iron at road 65.

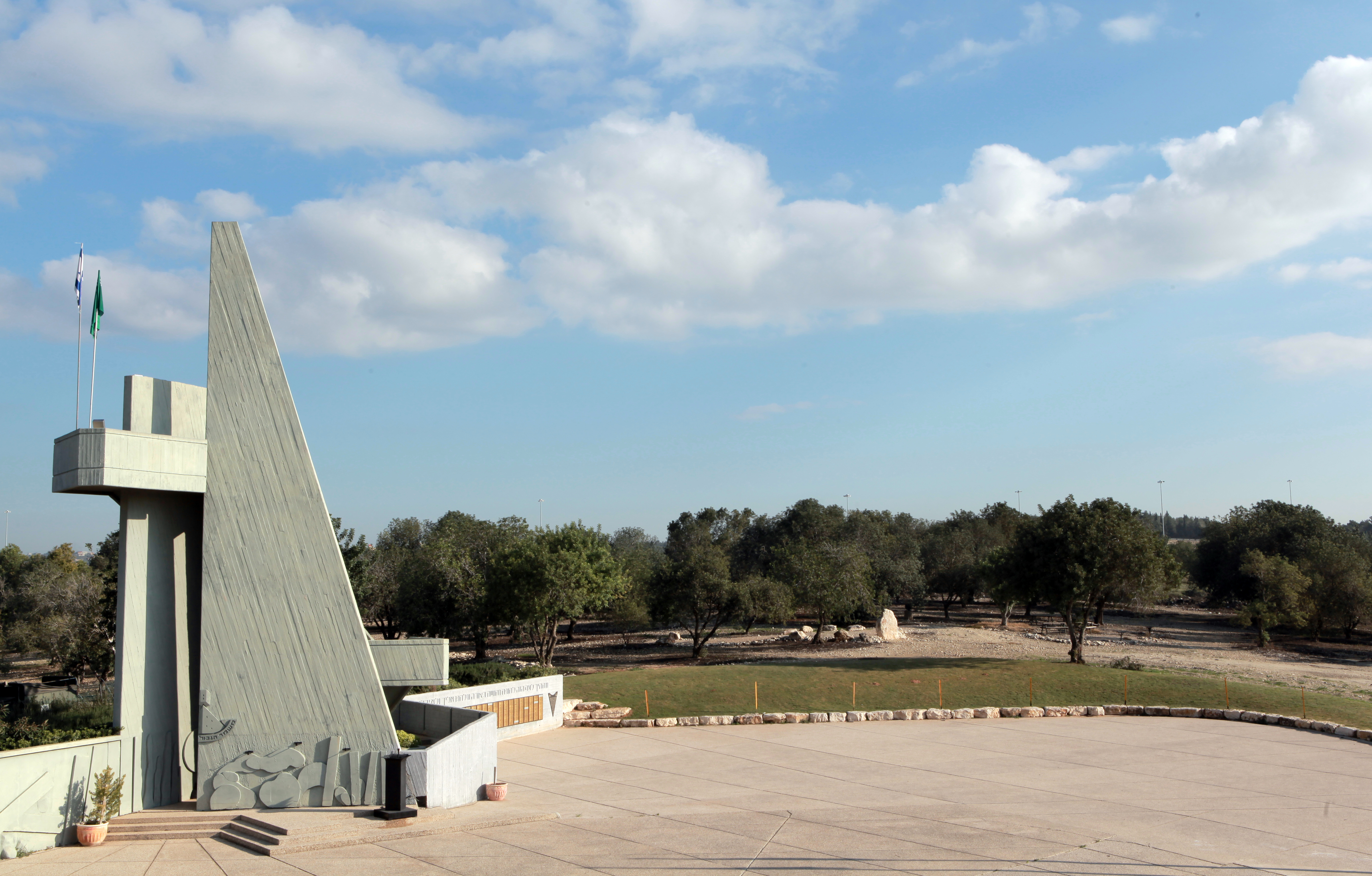
Israeli Border Police Memorial and Heritage Center.

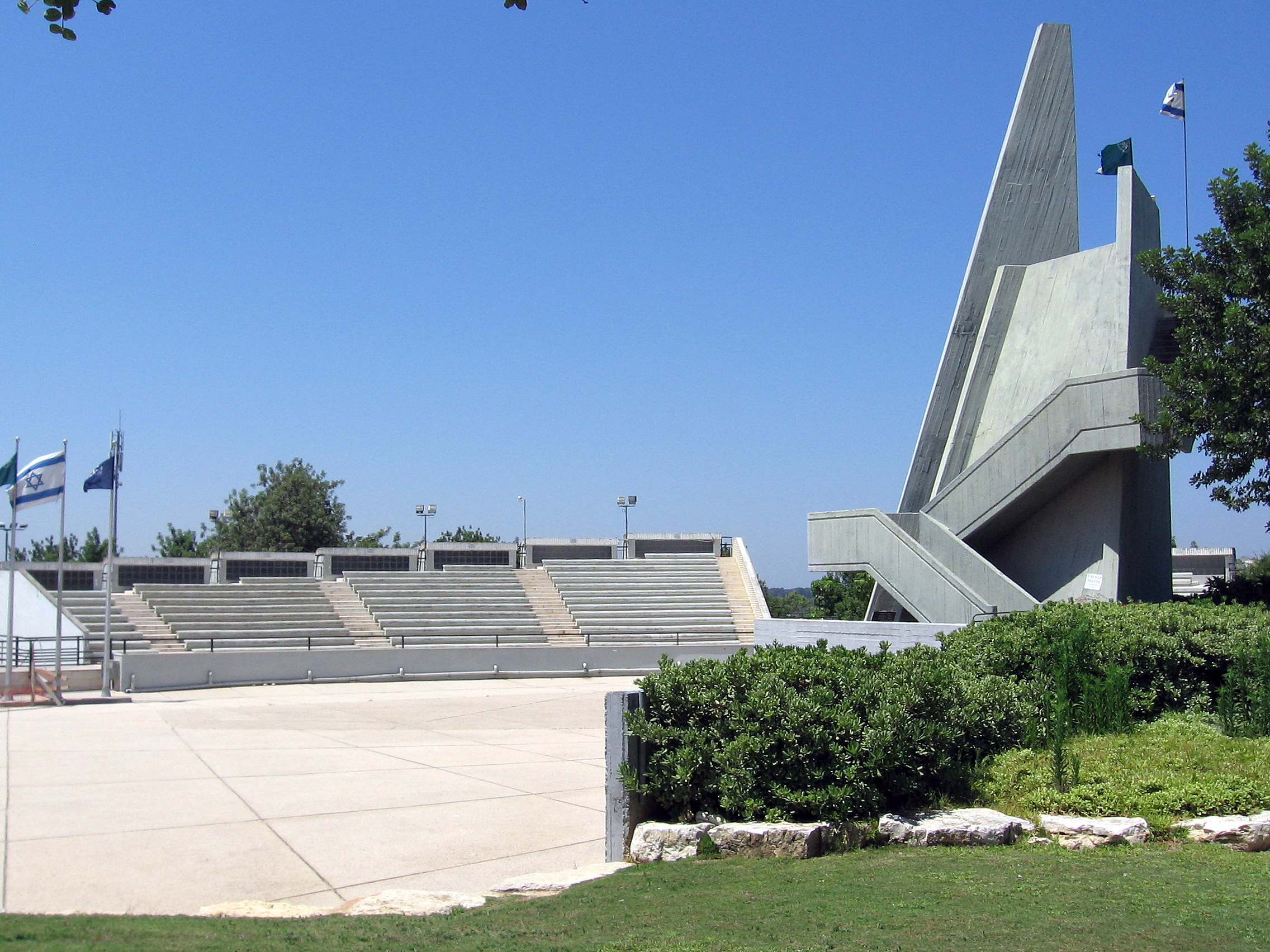
Israel Border Police monument.
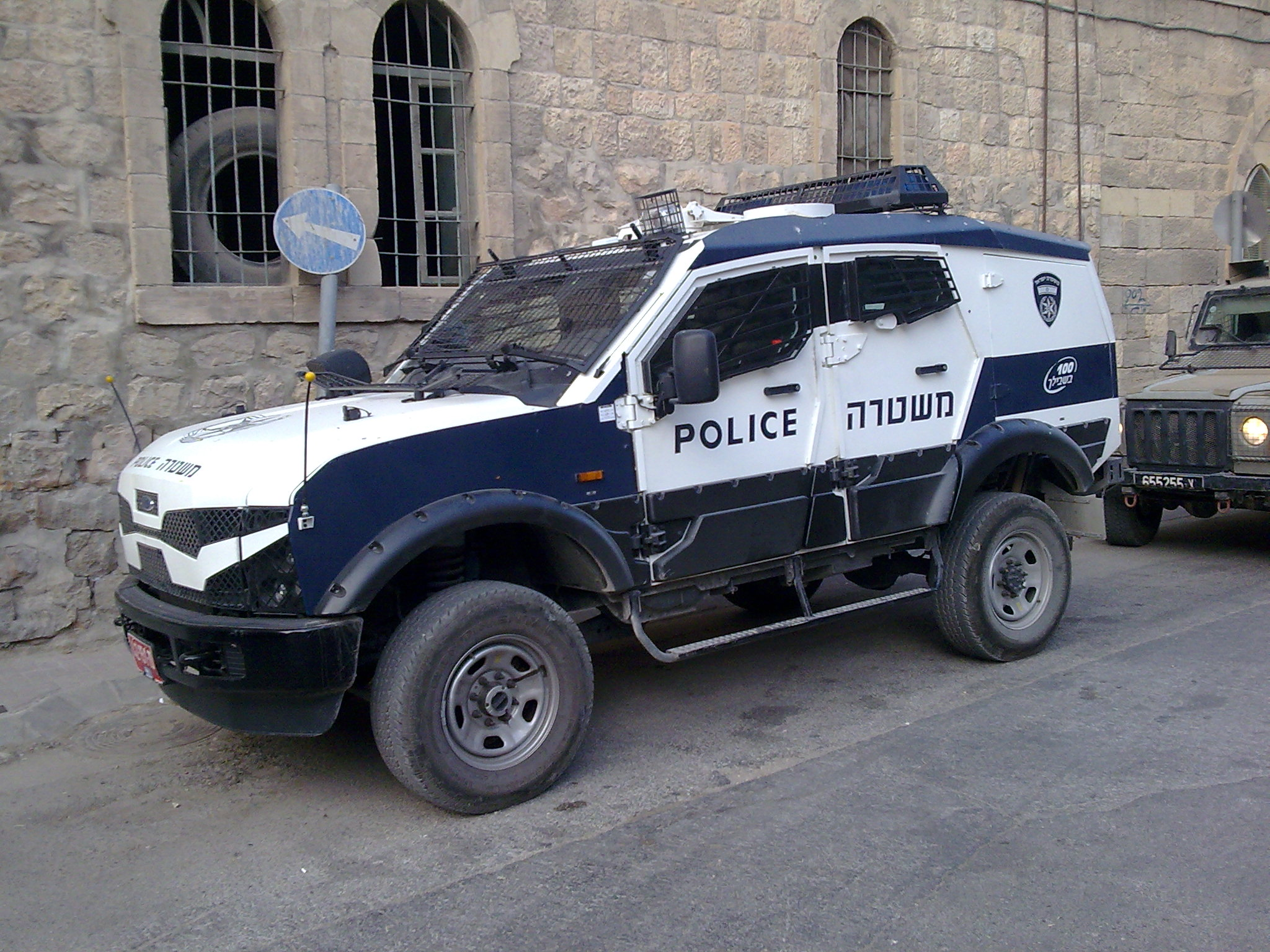
Carkal in the colors of the blue Police.

MDT Davids

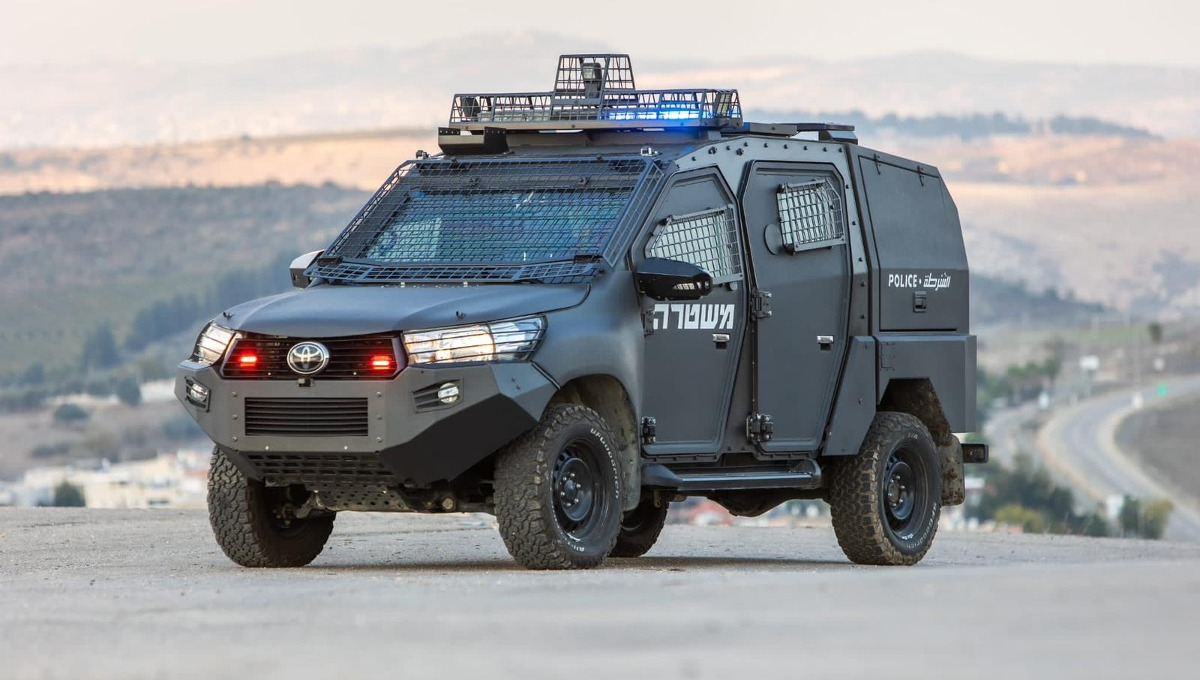
Plasan IBEX

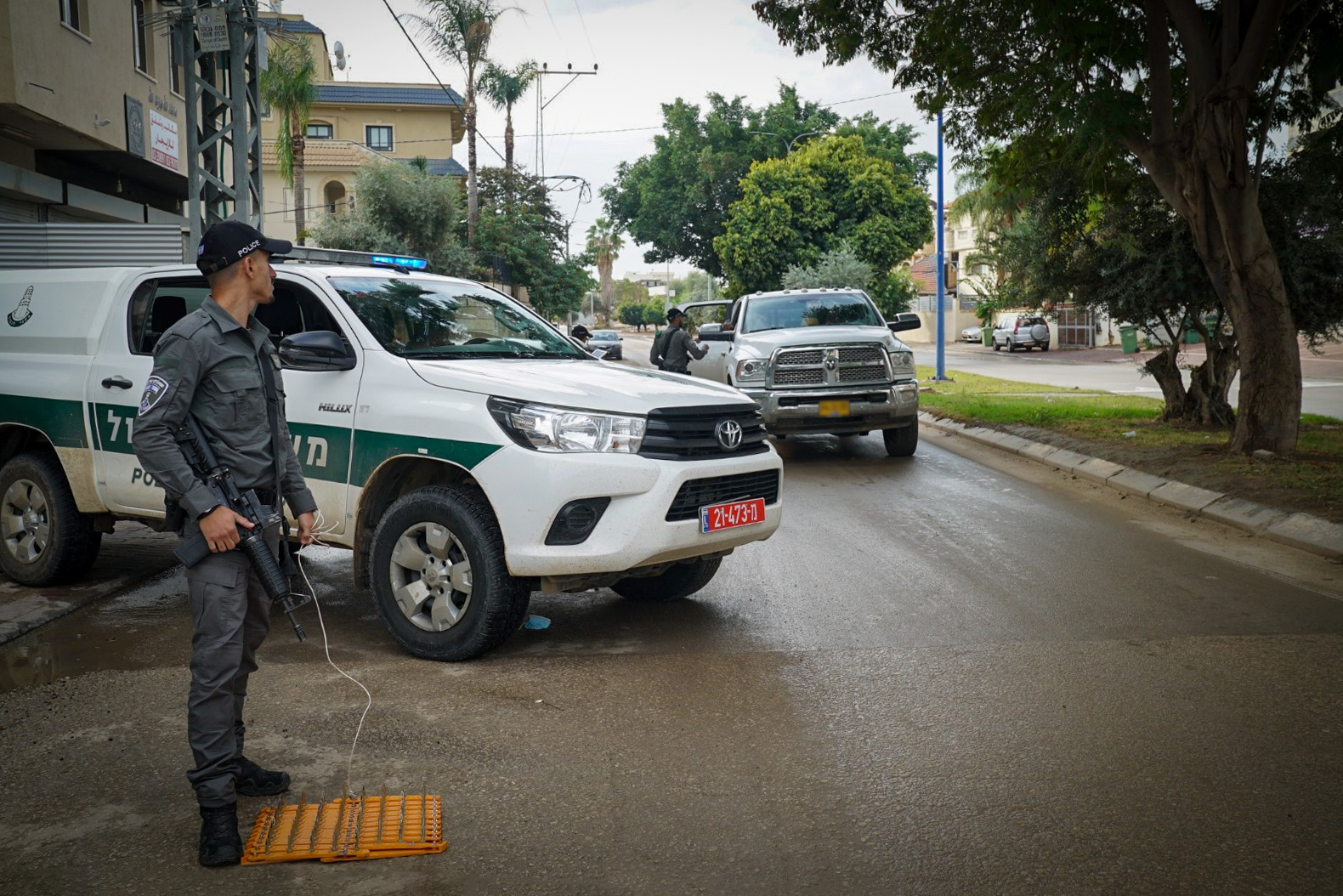
Toyota Hilux pickup

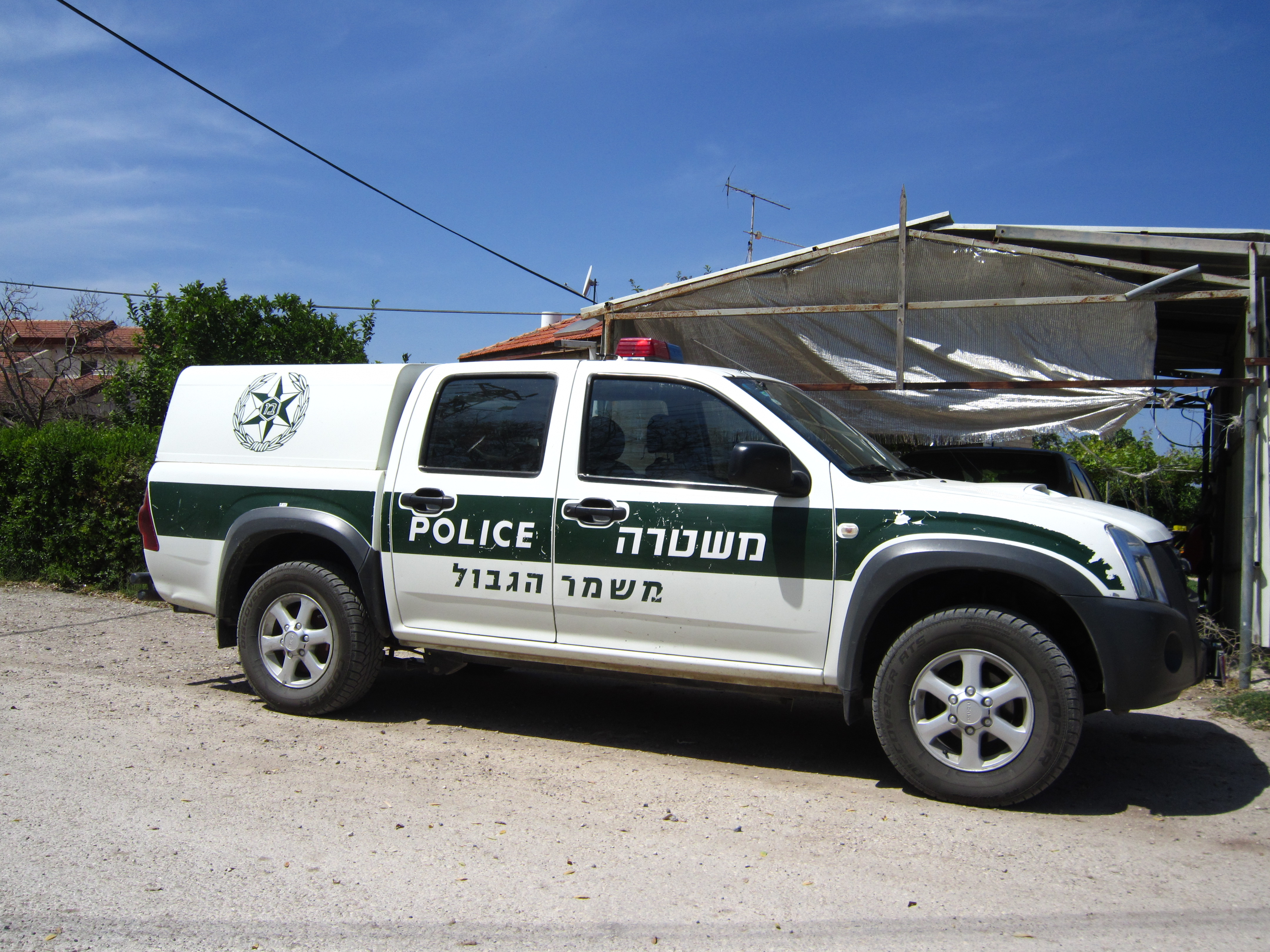
Border Police Isuzu D-Max pickup

AIL Storm, no longer in use.

== Criticism ==
In 2001, the Israeli NGO B'tselem reported that violence against Palestinians in the occupied territories was widespread among Border Police units. Several cases of abuse, including the breaking of the hand of a three-year-old child, were documented over a short period of months. It added that prosecution of officers who perpetrate such acts was difficult, since Border Police, in contravention of the law, do not carry tags allowing them to be identified, and registering complaints against them was hindered by numerous bureaucratic obstacles, such as making travel permits to Israeli courts difficult to obtain.

== See also ==
- Mishmeret Yesha
- Population and Immigration Authority

== Bibliography ==
- Bregman, Ahron (2002). Israel's Wars: A History Since 1947. London: Routledge. ISBN 0-415-28716-2
- Arno Klarsfeld, Yves Derai, Israël transit: Entretiens avec Yves Derai, L' Archipel, ISBN 2-84187-465-6
- Moshe Givati, Abir 21 - The Story of Eli Avram, Commander of the Undercover Unit, Reut Publishing, 2003.
- Yosef Argaman, The Border - Cases in the History of the Border Police, Israel: The Border Police, the "Green Berets" Association and the Ministry of Defense Publication, 1996.
