= Israel Sadan =

Israeli mayor

- ישראל סדן

6th mayor of Hadera
- In office 1998–2005
- Preceded by: Nehemia Laav
- Succeeded by: Haim Avitan

Personal details
- Born: Hadera, Israel

Israel Sadan (Hebrew: ישראל סדן; born 4 April 1947) is a former Commander of MAGAV (the Israeli Border Police) and a former mayor of Hadera who was convicted of bribing city council members.

== Biography ==
Sadan was born in Hadera. He joined the Israeli Police after completing his compulsory military service. In the early 1990s, he became the commander of the Haifa district of the Israeli police and, in 1995, he was appointed to be the commander of MAGAV. As commander of Magav, he opened the ranks for female soldiers.

After retiring, he quickly joined the political world and ran for Mayor of Hadera in 1998. He won the elections with more than 60% of the votes.

After a successful first term, Sadan ran again in 2003 and won with 43% of the votes versus 40% that obtained his former deputy Haim Avitan.

Despite his victory, he struggled to obtain a supportive coalition in the city council. Due to this situation, he addressed 3 city council members and offered them money in return for their support. A police investigation was opened soon after. Israel Sadan resigned and Avitan took his place.

In November 2006, Sadan was sentenced to 8 months of prison time and 7 months of probation.
