= MDT David =

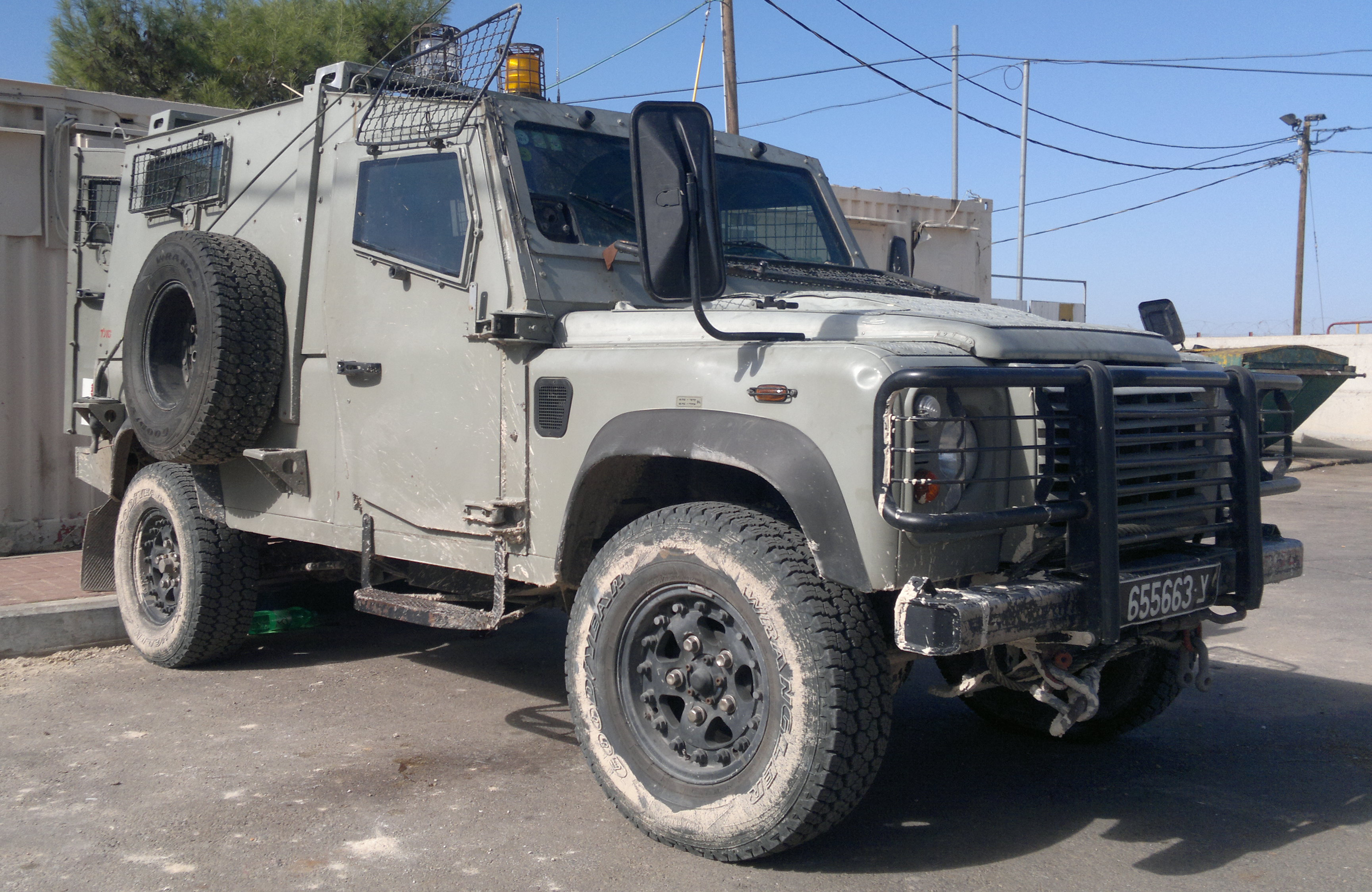
- A MDT David
- Type: Light Armored Vehicle
- Place of origin: United States

Service history
- In service: 2007–present
- Used by: See Users

Production history
- Manufacturer: MDT Armor Corporation, Shladot
- Produced: 2006–present

Specifications
- Mass: Land Rover Defender 110: 3,800 kg (8,378 lb), Toyota Hilux LC79: 4,700 kg (10,362 lb) (Gross weight)
- Length: Land Rover Defender 110: 4,470 mm (15 ft), Toyota Hilux LC79: 5,040 mm (17 ft)
- Width: Land Rover Defender 110: 1,790 mm (6 ft), Toyota Hilux LC79: 1,972 mm (6 ft)
- Height: Land Rover Defender 110: 2,035 mm (7 ft), Toyota Hilux LC79: 2,227 mm (7 ft)
- Crew: 4 – 6
- Engine: Turbocharged inter-cooled diesel engine Land Rover Defender 110: 122 bhp (91 kW) @ 3500 rpm, Toyota Land Cruiser LC79: 129 bhp (96 kW) @ 3,800rpm
- Drive: Permanent 4 wheel drive, Part time 4X4
- Transmission: Manual, 5/6 forward
- Suspension: Suspension can either be based on a Toyota Hilux, Toyota Land Cruiser, or Land Rover Defender.

The MDT David is an ultra light armored personnel carrier and light Armored Vehicle assembled by MDT Armor Corporation, an American subsidiary of Shladot LTD. The vehicle is based on Land Rover Defender and Toyota Hilux platforms and replaces the AIL Storm.

== History ==
On September 6, 2006, MDT Armor Corp was awarded a contract worth $10.1 million under a firm-fixed-price contract with an estimated completion date on July 30, 2007. On October 7, 2009, Arotech and Israel Military Industries (IMI) representatives signed an agreement to jointly work together and market the David worldwide except for India, Israel and the US.

On July 8, 2020, MDT Armor Corp was awarded a contract by US Army Contracting Command to purchase Davids under a $9,982,848 firm-fixed-price contract with an estimated completion date by October 31, 2022. On July 19, 2020, Chad received 28 Davids for operations under the G5 Sahel. 88 more were provided in 2021.

On March 30, 2023, MDT Armor Corp was awarded a contract by US Army Contracting Command to purchase Davids under a $21,913,585 firm-fixed-price contract, which is expected to be concluded by September 30, 2025. On October 19, 2023, the Israeli Ministry of Defense reported initial deliveries made from the US.

On April 15, 2024, Ecauador received 45 Davids, using the Toyota 79 chassis, with them being used in anti-terrorist operations. On August 11, 2024, Ecuador received a total of 90 Davids. By December 10, 2024, all of the Davids were delivered.

== Design ==
It is designed to provide protection in low intensity conflict. It is capable of resistance from assault rifle fire, blast from floor and roof, and limited protection against Improvised Explosive Devices.

The David has a 4-cylinder, turbocharged inter-cooled diesel engine. It can accommodate 4–6 fully armed people with three doors, roof hatch and 4–6 windows.

== Users ==
- Chad: Provided 28 Davids in 2020 by the United States for Chadian troops under the Special Anti-Terrorism Group in the G5 Sahel. 88 Davids provided to Chad in 2021.
- Ecuador: Acquired 45 out of 137 Davids with a Toyota Hilux 79 chassis under a contract worth $67,284,313 in April 2024. 90 Davids were received in August 2024. Contract completed in December 2024. Outfitted with Browning M2A2 QCB COAX HMGs.
- Israel: Used in the IDF. 370 Davids are in service and are expected to be retired from active service after 2027.
