= Oodnadatta (disambiguation) =

Oodnadatta is a town and locality in South Australia.

Oodnadatta may also refer to:

== South Australia ==
- Oodnadatta (biogeographic subregion), a subregion of the Stony Plains bioregion
- Oodnadatta Aboriginal School, an Aboriginal school
- Oodnadatta Airport
- Oodnadatta Track, a road
- Oodnadatta railway station, a heritage listed railway station in Oodnadatta

== Elsewhere ==
- Oodnadatta, a crater on Mars

== See also ==
- Coober Pedy Oodnadatta One Day Mail Run
