= GZL =

GZL may refer to:

- Gazal Corporation (ASX: GZL), a defunct Australian branded clothing company
- Stigler Regional Airport (FAA: GZL), Oklahoma, United States
- a series of EarthCruiser truck campers
