= OKA (truck) =

Australia 4-wheel-drive vehicle

OKA Motor Company
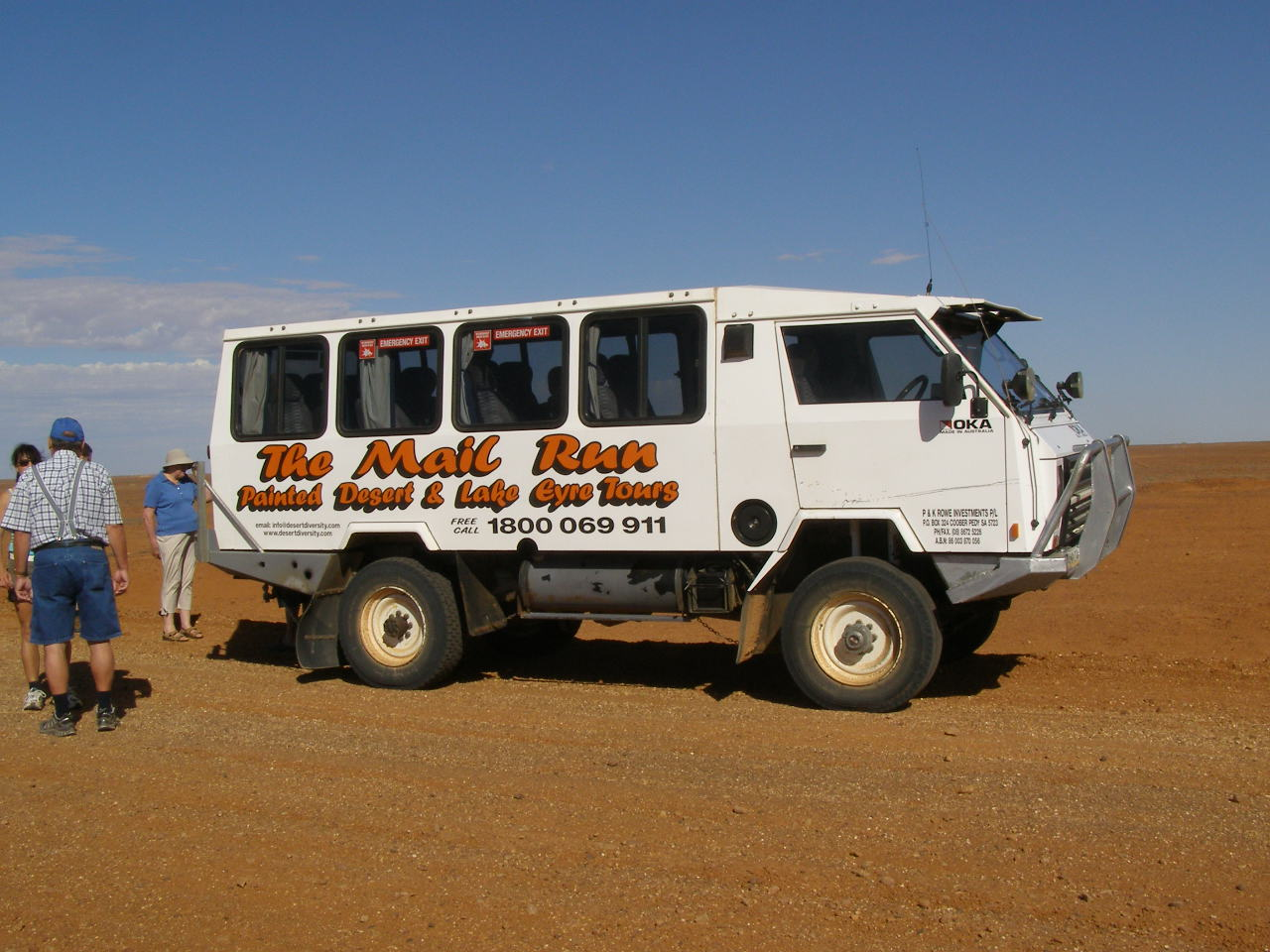
- An OKA tour bus on the Coober Pedy Oodnadatta One Day Mail Run
- Industry: Automotive
- Founded: 1986
- Headquarters: Fremantle, Western Australia
- Products: Four wheel drive trucks and buses
- Production output: circa 450
- Website: www.okaaustralia.com

OKA Motor Company manufactured cab over all terrain vehicles, particularly four wheel drive trucks and tour buses in Bibra Lake, Western Australia. It manufactured three consecutive models: the XT, LT and NT. These models were available in a variety of body styles including cab-chassis, single cab, dual cab, multi cab and bus.

== History ==
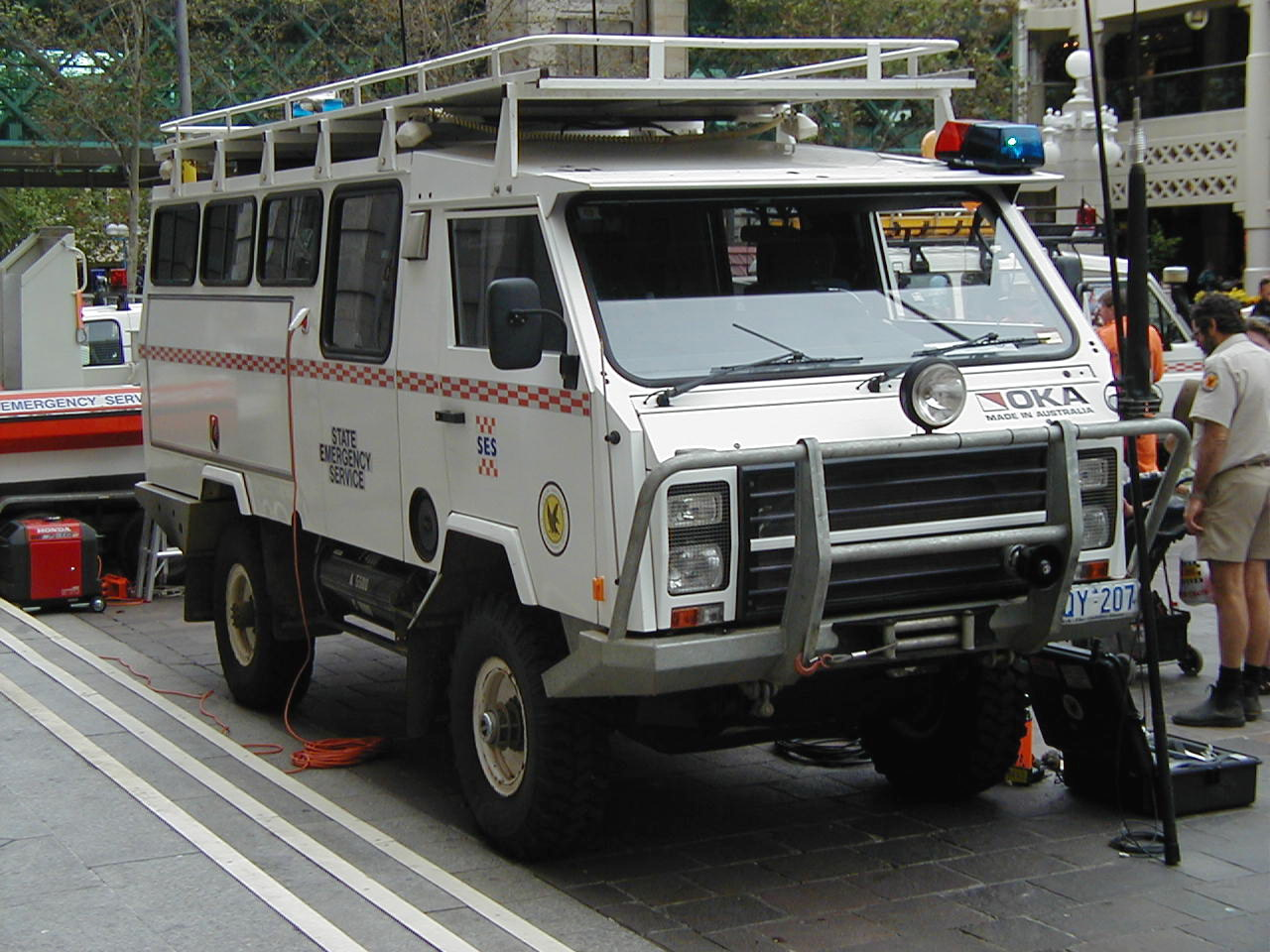
State Emergency Service of Western Australia OKA

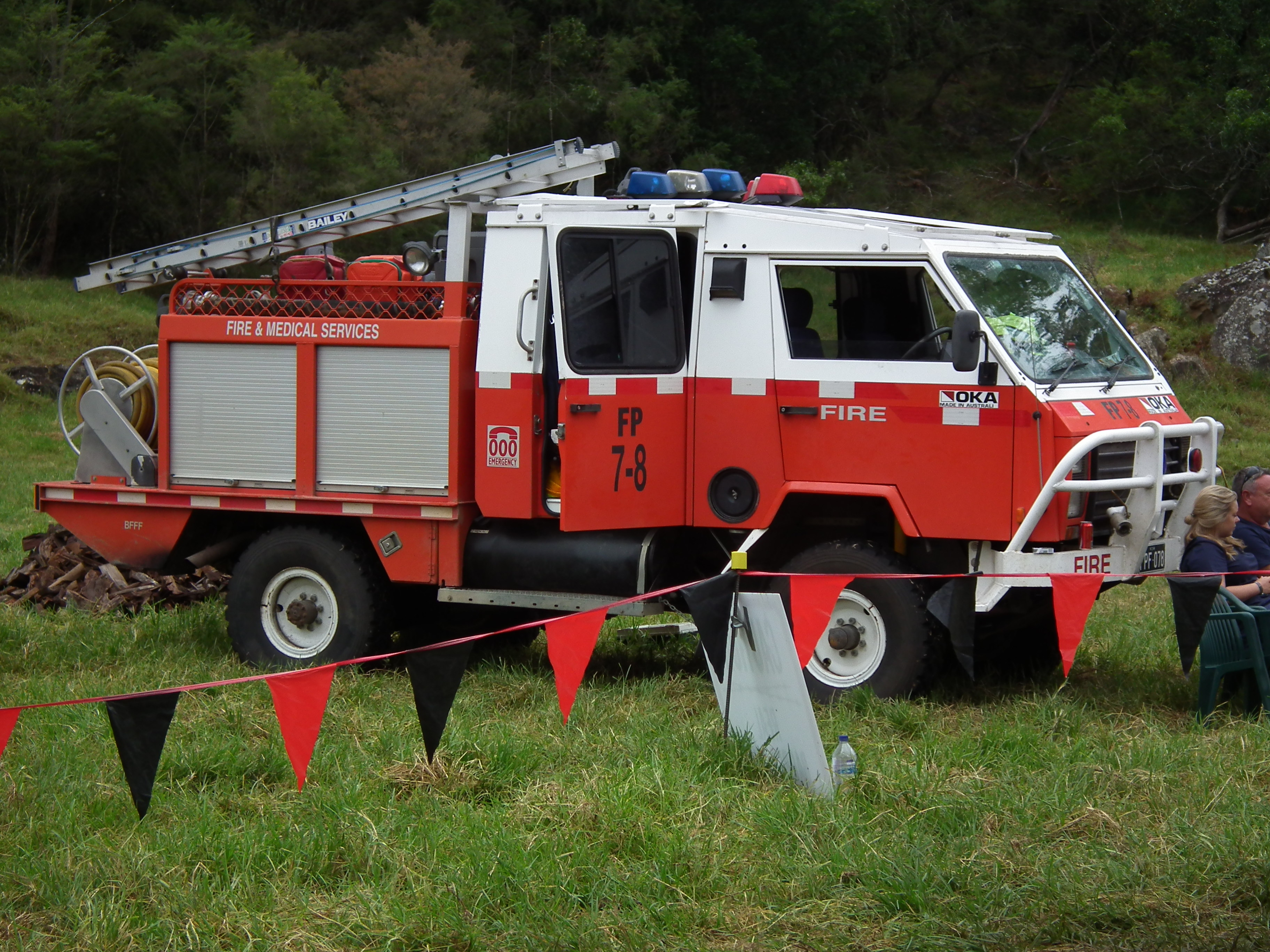
1995 OKA crew cab fire truck formerly used by the New South Wales Rural Fire Service but now used by a privately operated event fire service

OKA Australia was founded in 1986 when a group of Australian mine executives discussed that each of them needed an off-road truck with a three-ton payload and nothing on the market at the time filled those requirements. Those executives formed a consortium and the OKA brand was born.

Having agreed on the blueprints, the group undertook a comprehensive market study covering over 1,200 mining companies, government departments, farmers, the Australian Defence Force and potential private users to establish the parameters for the design. In 1987, work on the first prototype began and in 1988, it underwent its first test. Prototypes continued to be produced even during production up until 1992. In December 1994 OKA was listed on the Australian Securities Exchange with Hicom taking a 11% shareholding.

Soon after, the first production model, the XT, entered production. It was followed by the LT which was itself followed by the last model, the NT. These vehicles have been supplied to government departments, tour operators, private industries, mining industries, the military and recreational companies and were, aside from Australia, sold in Papua New Guinea and Africa. The development of adapted models for the UAE and European markets was commenced but was never completed.

OKAs were available mostly with the four cylinder Perkins Phaser engine, but provision was also made for the 6 cylinder Perkins Phaser. A model was made with a V8 diesel, for the UAE.

In 1997, OKA licensed its technologies to Indian auto maker Hindustan Motors to produce its RTV brand of multi-utility vehicles. It has been regarded as one of the most rollover prone vehicles and was discontinued in 2008. Initial models and prototypes were built in Australia however production was soon moved to India.

In 1999, OKA's largest shareholder, Malaysian entrepreneur Paari Vell took control of the company.

In 2011 OKA was placed in administration after the discovery of misappropriation of funds and the theft of intellectual property manuals. An attempt to recapitalise the company was unsuccessful and it ceased. Over 450 OKA vehicles were built.

In 2018, a Perth-based investor who had been providing parts to owners acquired the brand rights and manufacturing facilities. The new company, OKA All Terrain Vehicles, is focused on supporting vehicles currently on the road as well as developing a new model.

== Variants ==
=== Trucks ===
- Chassis cab
- Single cab pick-up
- Dual Cab
- Multicab
- RTV MultiVan - 7 seats in the module
- RTV Combi - 8 seats in module

=== Buses ===
- RTV Standard A - 14 including the driver. The 12 seats in the rear ride in fixed plastic seats
- RTV Standard B- 12 seats coach style
- RTV Standard C - 12 seat luxury bus
- XT/LT/NT Tour Bus - 12 seat

=== Leisure ===
- Pop-top van - factory built raisable roof with caravan conversion by third-party outfitters
