= Coober Pedy Oodnadatta One Day Mail Run =

Mail service in South Australia

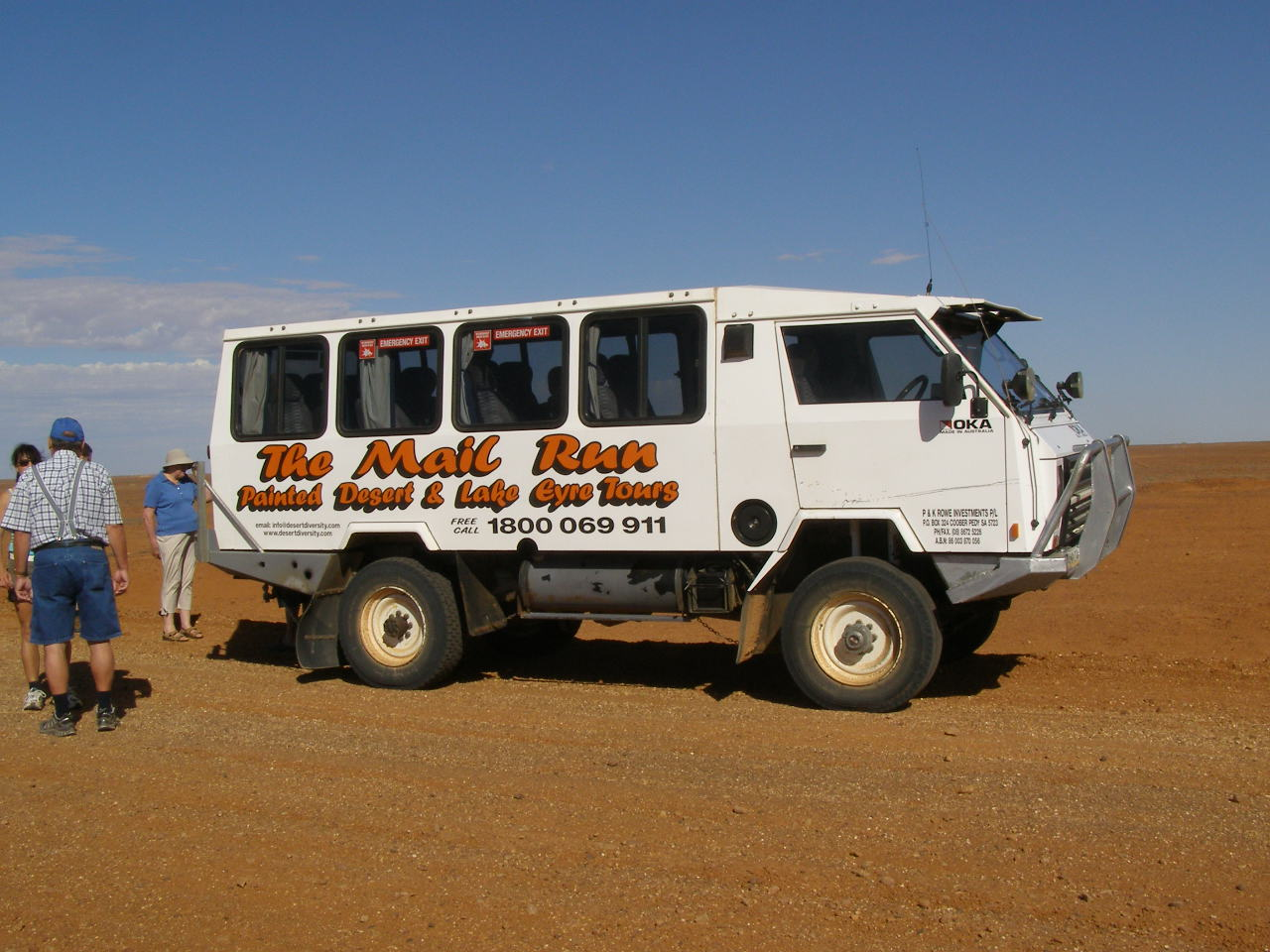
The OKA mail truck

The Coober Pedy Oodnadatta One Day Mail Run is a 4WD mail service in the outback of South Australia.

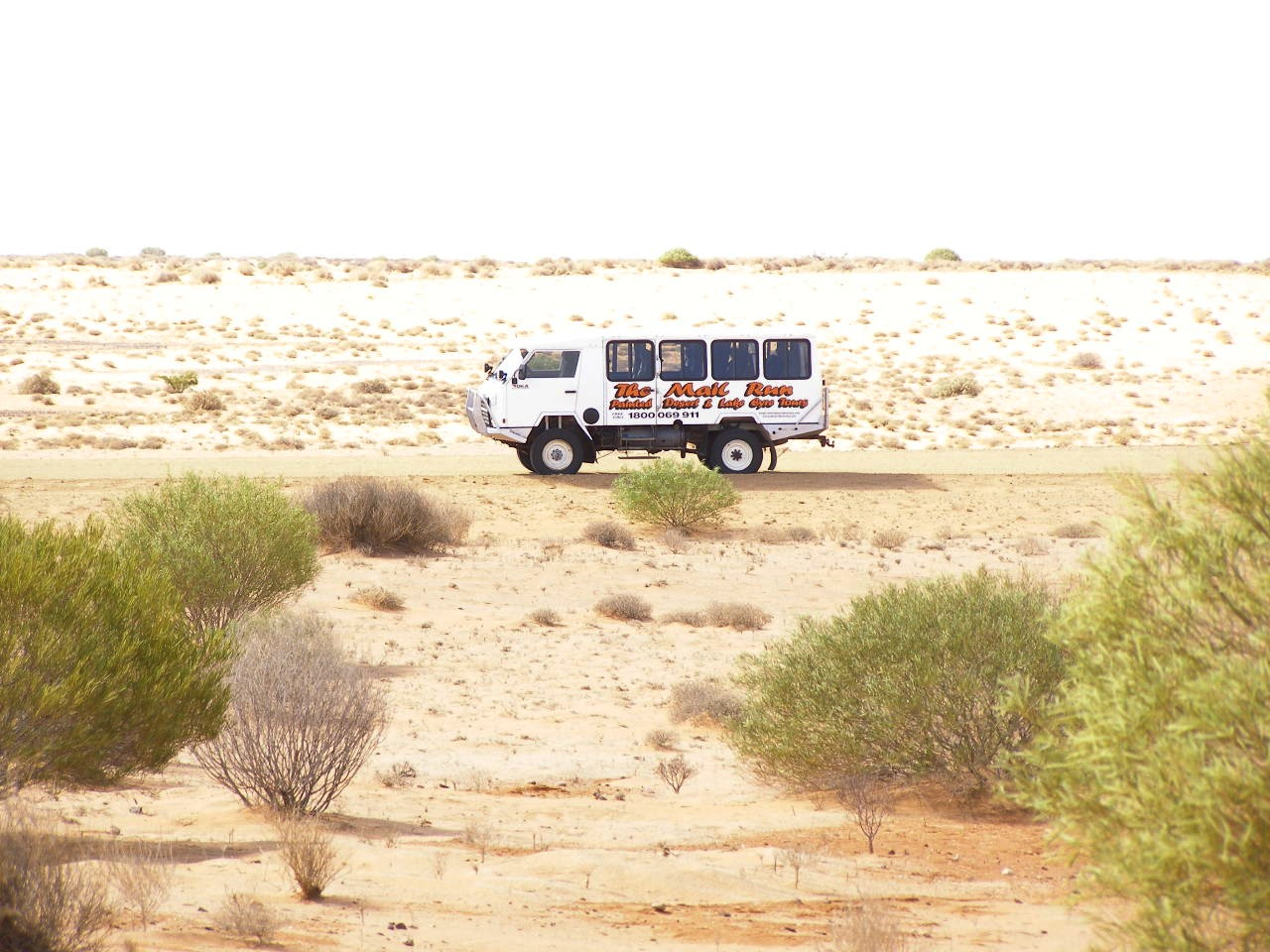
The OKA mail truck in the desert

Twice a week, the OKA bus travels from Coober Pedy to William Creek to Oodnadatta and then back to Coober Pedy, on unsealed roads. The road between William Creek and Oodnadatta is the famous Oodnadatta Track. The direction of the mail run is reversed on successive trips (that is, Oodnadatta then Coober Pedy). The mail truck carries some general freight and also passengers.

The trip takes around 12 hours with stops for meals at William Creek and Oodnadatta. The truck also stops to deliver mail at a number of homesteads, including Anna Creek Station, the world's largest cattle station. Indeed, so large is Anna Creek station, that most of the mail run's route is within the Anna Creek station. When carrying tourists as passengers, it also stops at scenic points including the Dingo Fence and ruins connected with the old Ghan railway.
