= EarthCruiser =

Expedition and Overlanding Vehicle Manufacturer

EarthCruiser started as an Australian company that designs and manufactures off-road recreational vehicles and truck campers for expedition and overlanding. The company was founded in 2008 by Lance Gillies and Michelle Boltz after the couple could not find a suitable overland vehicle for undertaking the Great Sandy Desert. EarthCruiser's motto is, "Go Further, Stay Longer."

Production started in Bend 2014, EarthCruiser employed over 50 technicians building expedition vehicles. Each vehicle takes approximately three and a half to four months to complete. Vehicles for the U.S. market were built in Bend, Oregon, while vehicles in the Australian market are built in North Wollongong, New South Wales.

== History ==
- 2008: Founded by Australian Lance Gillies and his American wife, Michelle Boltz in Brisbane, Australia.
- 2009: Introduced EarthCruiser, the company's first production expedition vehicle based on the Mitsubishi Fuso chassis.
- 2011: Introduced EarthCruiser EXP, an expedition vehicle with an electric pop-up roof.
- 2013: Moved company headquarters to Bend, Oregon to be closer to family.
- 2015: Introduced EarthCruiser FX, an expedition vehicle with a fixed-roof.
- 2017: Introduced GZL, the company's first production slide-in camper for pickup trucks, equipped with a pop-up roof.
- 2018: Introduced EXD, a camper body and vehicle modification package for American one-ton pickup truck chassis'.
- 2018: Introduced MOD, a customizable version of the GZL slide-in camper body for pickup trucks.
- 2020: Introduced Dual Cab versions of the EarthCruiser FX and EXP.
- 2020: Introduced Terranova, an expedition vehicle based on various American one-ton pickup truck platforms.
- 2022: Announced EarthCruiser EXP, FX, and the CORE commercial vehicle's transition to the Isuzu NPR Series chassis.
- 2022: Announced EarthCruiser Adventure, a tour division overseeing training expeditions for small groups of EarthCruiser owners.
- 2023: Announced an expansion into overlanding products for EV, starting with slide-in campers for EV trucks.

== Vehicles ==
=== EarthCruiser (2009–2022 to current) ===
The EarthCruiser company shares their name with the original prototype and first production expedition vehicle line released in 2009. Built on the single cab Mitsubishi Fuso Canter 4x4 chassis, the RV was powered by the standard GM Vortec 6.0L V8 or an optional 3.0L four-cylinder turbo diesel engine. The gasoline V8 model had a driving range of 600 miles while the less-powerful diesel variant range was 900 miles. In 2020, a dual cab version of the platform was released which had four doors with four seats instead of two doors with two seats. In 2022, the EarthCruiser chassis transitioned to the Isuzu NPR Series Class 4 platform, powered by the GM 6.6L Duramax turbo diesel engine.

The EarthCruiser fiberglass camper bodies are insulated to help reduce energy usage. The rounded shape is intended to reduce wind drag at higher speeds and avoid accidental contact with terrain while on a trail. Depending on the model, the body may have a fixed or electric pop-up roof upon which solar panels are mounted that feed the onboard battery and electrical system. Other exterior attachments include an electric awning and recovery winch. An EarthCruiser camper body is attached to a vehicle chassis using kinetic spring mounts to prevent stress and damage to the body structure. Inside the camper, amenities include a shower, slide-out toilet, sink, refrigerator/freezer, mini wine cellar, dinette table, and two beds which can sleep up to four people.

==== EarthCruiser EXP (2011–2022 to current ) ====
The EarthCruiser EXP is the model that company-founder Lance Gillies considers to be the original EarthCruiser. Introduced in 2011, it is the most expensive model, equipped with an electrically-operated roof that increases the ceiling height by 24 inches the extra height allowing a 360 degree view out of the canopy. When lowered, the diminished roof line allows the vehicle to fit more easily into a shipping container.

==== EarthCruiser FX (2015–2022 - current) ====
The EarthCruiser FX is a more basic, lower-priced model with a stationary roof. Introduced in 2015, it is engineered to better handle extreme temperatures as the body is fully insulated, unlike the canopy portion of the EXP model. The roofline sits eight inches above the cab roof, but is still compact enough to fit into a shipping container.

=== Terranova (2021– to current ) ===
The Terranova is an expedition vehicle built on a Chevrolet, Ford, or RAM one-ton pickup truck chassis. First announced in 2020, the platform is targeted at owners with strong brand preferences or feel more comfortable operating a consumer-class vehicle over a commercial-grade truck. A domestically-manufactured chassis also allows better availability of parts and more familiar maintenance procedures.

The camper body is constructed of fiberglass with a foam core, molded into a cab-over configuration, and bolted to the vehicle chassis using a kinetic mount system. The roof can be electrically raised for a panoramic view using a similar setup to that of the EXD and EXP, including the canopy with integrated vinyl windows, insect and privacy screens. When raised the canopy allows the camper to sleep up to four people. When lowered, the RV is more compact for trails and more aerodynamic. Solar panels are mounted on top of the roof to supply the onboard battery and electrical system. Inside the camper, amenities include a bathroom, sink, induction cooktop, refrigerator/freezer, ventilation fan, and an optional air conditioner. A shower is also included, however it is located on the outside of the unit.

=== CORE (2021– current ) ===
The CORE is a chassis cab expedition vehicle; a camper body is not included. Introduced in 2022, the model has the same Isuzu NPR Series Class 4 chassis as the EarthCruiser EXP and FX vehicles, powered by a GM 6.6L Duramax turbo diesel engine and available in a single or dual cab configuration.

The nature of the body allows the customer to customise the vehicle for their purposes.

== Camper bodies ==
=== EXD (2018–2020) ===
The EXD was a camper body and vehicle modification package designed for a 2017 or newer Chevrolet, Ford, or Ram 1-ton long-bed pickup truck chassis. Introduced in 2018, the package required customers to provide their own chassis cab, but in return, they could select the vehicle brand, cab size, and engine type. The camper body was connected to the vehicle chassis using EarthCruiser kinetic mounts, or alternatively attached to a flat bed as a quicker and cheaper option. Mounting to the chassis was part of an "Expedition Package" which included camper body side skirts and a cab pass-through. Donor vehicles would also receive upgraded bumpers, wheels and suspension as part of the deal.

The camper body was a non-cab-over design with molded body lines meant to match those of the vehicle cab. Composed of one inch thick insulated fiberglass, the walls were angled to avoid trees while on the trail and lessen wind noise on the road. The roof was four inches thick and electrically-operated to raise for 360 degree visibility inside the camper, similar to that of the EarthCruiser EXP expedition vehicle. On top, the roof was recessed for standard solar panels which fed the onboard battery and electrical system. Inside, the camper was equipped with amenities including a walk-through shower, sink, refrigerator, induction cooktop, roof-fan system, dinette table, and a bed for two, although there was sky bed option for children as well. Overall, the unit weighed about 3,000 pounds.

=== EV () ===
The EV slide-in camper body is currently in a pre-order status so not many details are known. As part of the deposit program, customers are relaying their preferences which could potentially tweak the product outcome. The new model will be compatible with both EV and non-EV vehicles. The EV camper line is likely never going to be produced, as the company closed in April of 2024.

=== GZL (2017–2020) ===
The GZL was EarthCruiser's first slide-in camper body. Introduced in 2017, it was intended to be an affordable alternative to the more expensive EarthCruiser vehicles. Multiple versions of the body allowed the product line to fit both mid-size and full-size pickup trucks. The unit itself was constructed of insulated fiberglass and was molded into a cab-over configuration. Similar to the higher-end expedition vehicles, the camper featured amenities such as a shower, portable toilet, dinette table, refrigerator and a queen-sized bed. Unlike the EXP and EXD, the solar panel-integrated pop-top roof only lifted on one end and did not do so electrically.

==== GZL 300 ====
The 300 was a narrow version of the GZL, designed to fit mid-size pickup trucks including the Toyota Tacoma, Chevrolet Colorado, GMC Canyon, Dodge Dakota, Honda Ridgeline, and Ford Ranger. The unit weighed about 1,200 pounds.

==== GZL 400 ====
The 400 was a wide version of the GZL, designed to fit full-size pickup trucks including the Toyota Tundra, Nissan Titan, Chevrolet Silverado, GMC Sierra, Dodge Ram 1500, and Ford F-150.The unit weighed about 1,500 pounds.

==== GZL 500 ====
The 500 was a version of the GZL designed specifically for flatbed truck installation.

=== MOD (2018– CURRENT ) ===
The MOD, an acronym for "My Own Design," was EarthCruiser's most customizable product and considered to be a low-cost version of the GZL. Introduced in 2018, the slide-in fiberglass camper body came in a cab-over configuration with a pop-up roof and overhead lights. Additionally, the unit had a variety of PAKs (Personal Accessory Kits) that could be added or removed from the camper. PAK options included small or large seat boxes, sink system, storage cabinet, counter extension, toilet cabinet, and a cooler cabinet.

==== MOD 300 CURRENT ====
The 300 was a narrow version of the MOD, designed to fit 2012 or newer mid-size pickup trucks including the Toyota Tacoma, Chevrolet Colorado, GMC Canyon, Dodge Dakota, Honda Ridgeline, and Ford Ranger. The unit weighed about 700 pounds.

==== MOD 400 CURRENT ====
The 400 was a wide version of the MOD, designed to fit 2012 or newer full-size pickup trucks including the Toyota Tundra, Nissan Titan, Chevrolet Silverado, GMC Sierra, Dodge Ram 1500, and Ford F-150.The unit weighed about 800 pounds.

== Training expeditions ==
EarthCruiser Adventures are training expeditions for small groups of EarthCruiser owners. The domestic and overseas journeys are staffed by tour guides who help participants develop their overlanding skills, including driving, navigation, and cooking. EarthCruiser expedition vehicles that are eligible for the trip include models EXP, FX and Terranova.
