= Bethke brothers =

East German defectors

The Bethke brothers (Bethke-Brüder), Ingo Bethke (born 1954), Holger Bethke (born 1953) and Egbert Bethke (born 1959) are three brothers who individually escaped from East Germany using three different methods.

== Early life ==
The brothers' parents, Claus and Marianne, both worked at the Ministry of the Interior. Ingo was a member of the party-affiliated Free German Youth, but grew disillusioned in his teens. In a 2014 interview with Der Spiegel, he stated "I wanted to wear jeans. Listen to the Beatles and the Stones. And get to know the hidden country behind the Wall."

== Escapes ==
=== Ingo's escape ===
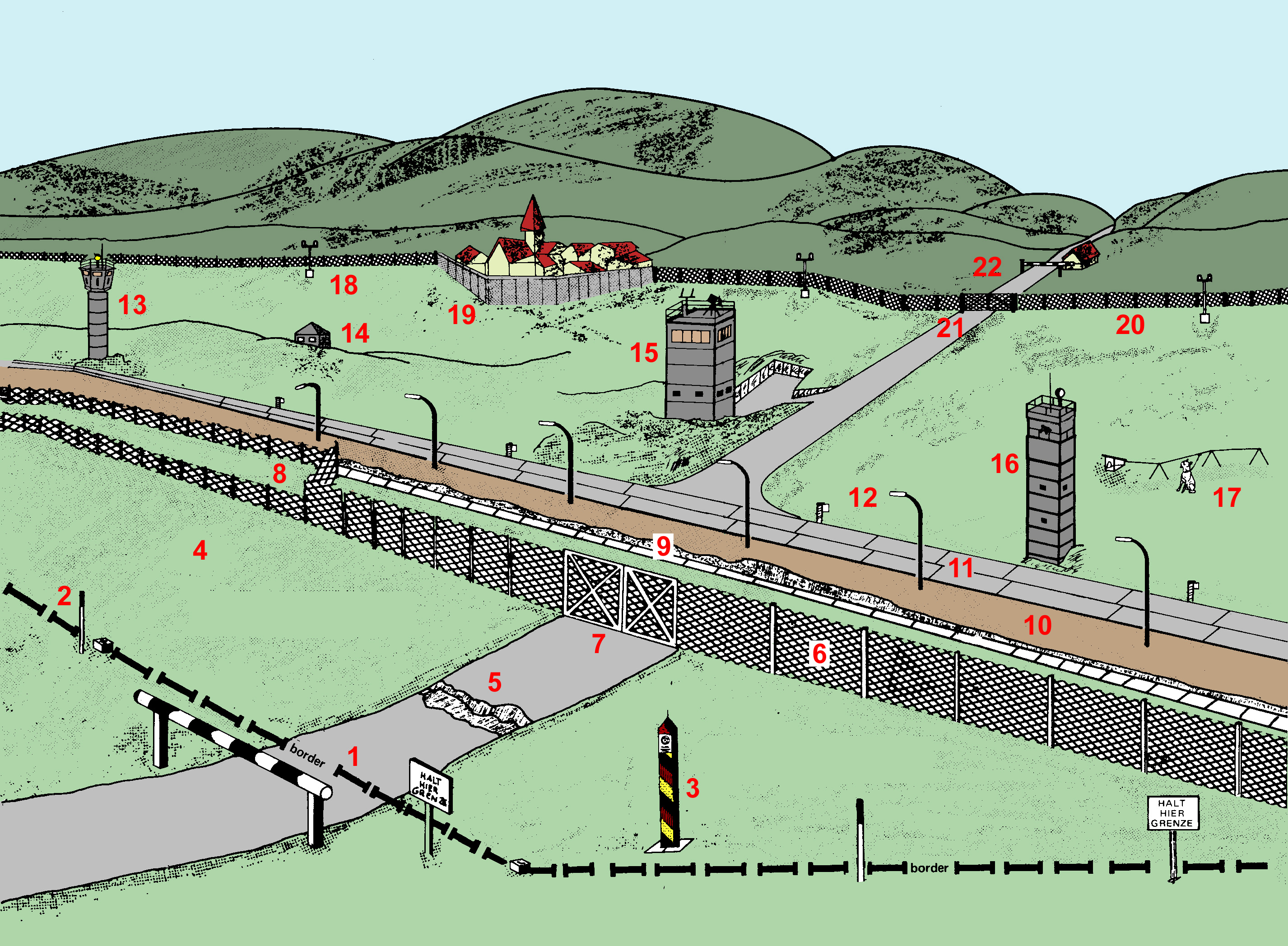
Diagram of typical inner German border fortifications

As the child of high-ranked party members, Ingo was not considered a flight risk, so he completed his mandatory military service in the National People's Army at the inner German border in southwestern Mecklenburg, between Lenzen and Dömitz. On 26 May 1975, six months after the end of his service, Ingo and a friend drove to the border area where he had served, cut a hole in the fence, navigated 500 m (1,600 ft) through a minefield and paddled some 200 m (660 ft) across the river Elbe to West Germany using an air mattress.

=== Holger's escape ===
On 31 March 1983, on his 30th birthday, Holger fired an arrow attached to fishing line from the attic of a house in Schmollerstraße, East Berlin over the Berlin Wall. Communicating using a children's walkie-talkie smuggled from West Germany, the brothers used the fishing line to pull a length of steel cable across, which Ingo then attached to his car and pulled taut. Holger then attached pulleys to this improvised zipline and descended across the wall.

In the wake of the two brothers' defections, their parents Claus and Marianne were demoted and lost their official positions in the Ministry.

=== Egbert's escape ===
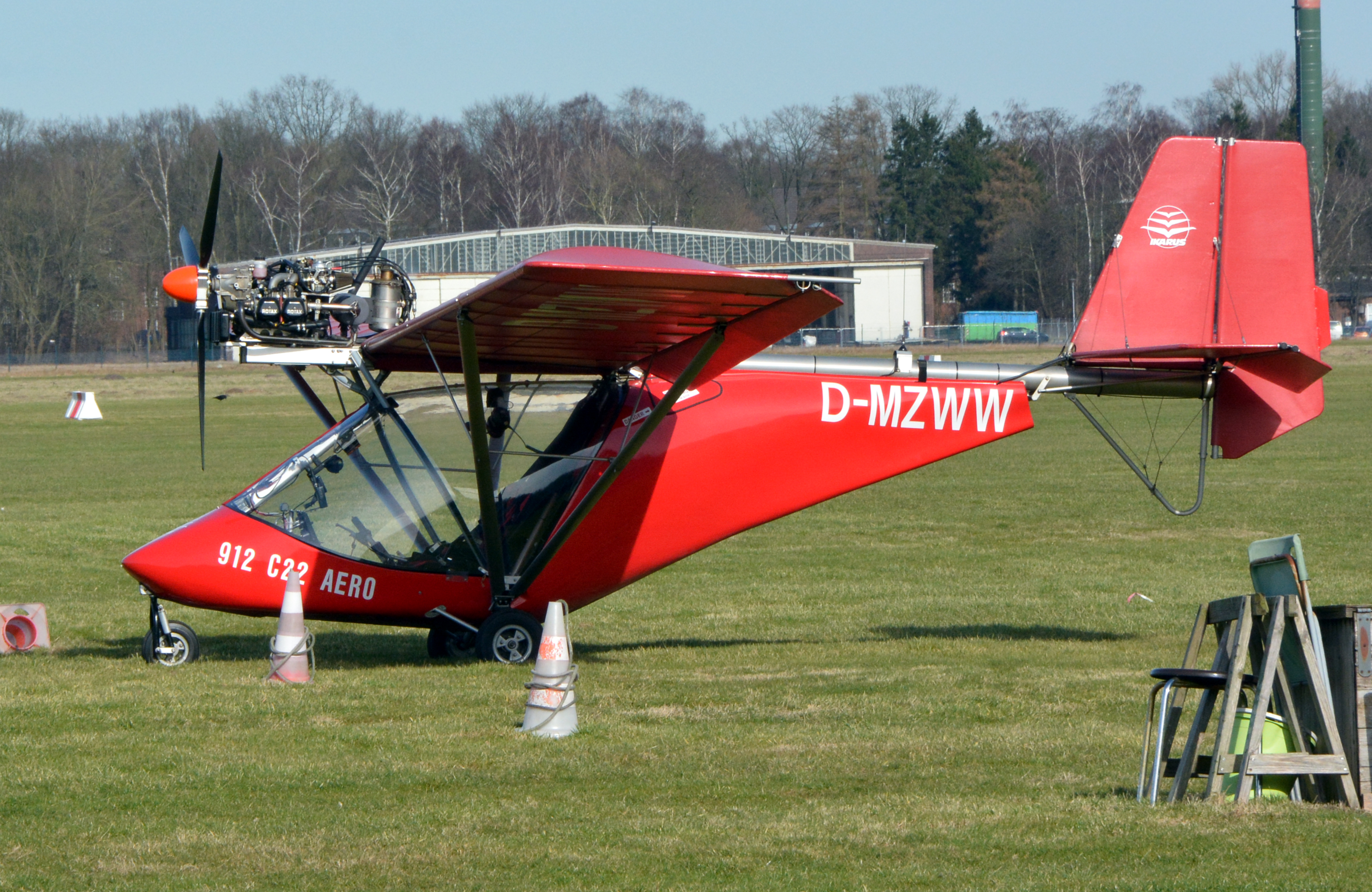
An Ikarus C22 ultralight aircraft similar to that used by the brothers

Egbert, now under heavy suspicion, was offered the chance to migrate to the West as a spy. He rejected the offer.

Ingo and Holger sold their pub in Cologne to finance purchasing two Ikarus C22 ultralight aircraft. Since recreational flying in West Berlin was forbidden, they had to smuggle the aircraft in. In the early hours of 26 May 1989, wearing military jackets with Soviet insignia, they took off from Britzer Garten, West Berlin in the aircraft, which had been painted camouflage green and decorated with red stars. Ingo landed in Treptower Park, East Berlin to pick up the waiting Egbert, while Holger patrolled overhead. The planes successfully returned to West Berlin and landed in front of the Reichstag, which was not used at the time.

== Aftermath ==
The Berlin Wall fell six months after Egbert's escape. In 1994, Egbert and Ingo both moved back to Adlershof, their former home in East Berlin.
