= Karpfenteich in the Treptower Park =

Pond in Berlin, Germany

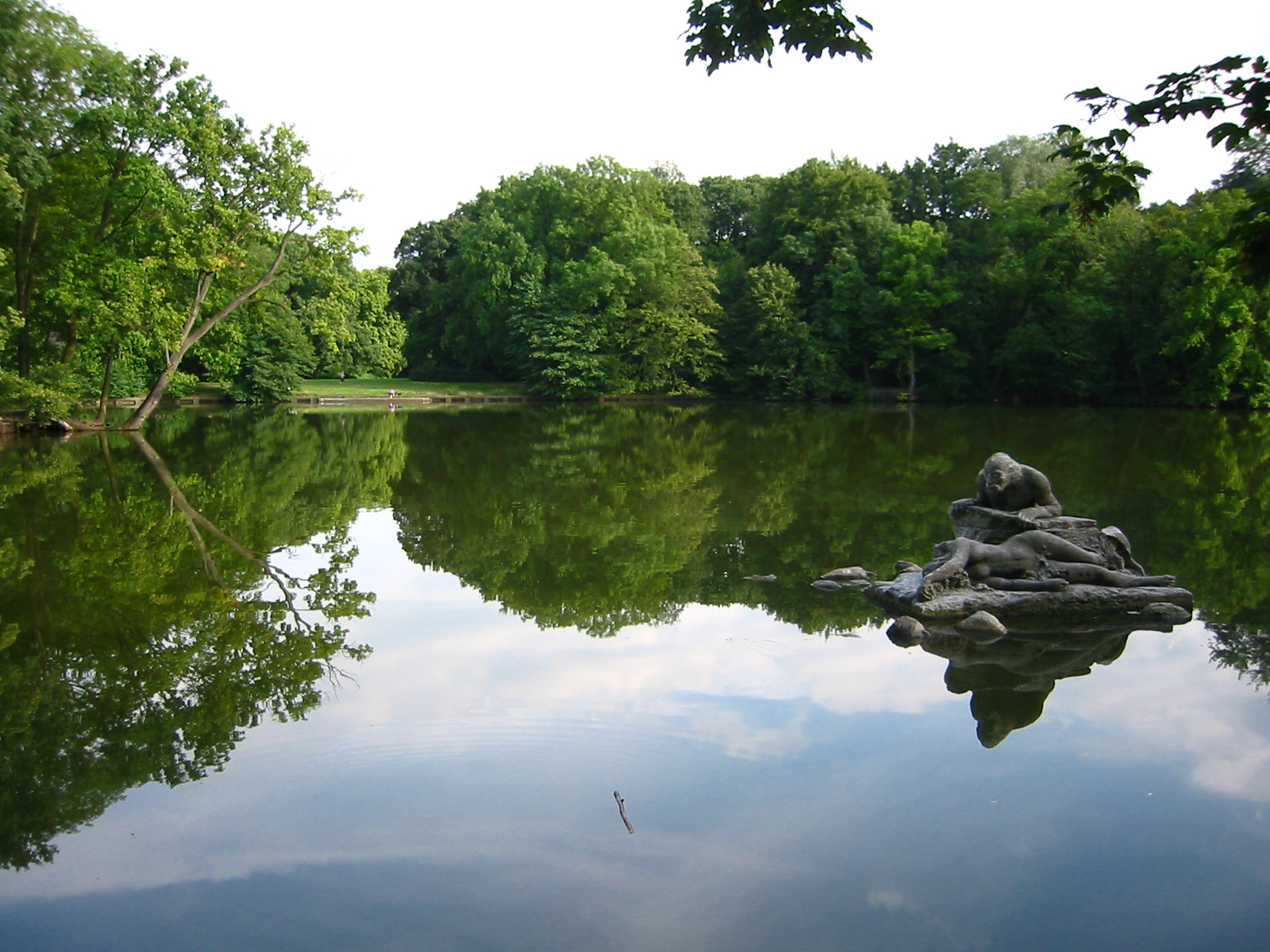
- Karpfenteich in the Treptower Park

- Location within Germany
- Coordinates: 52°29′04″N 13°28′19″E
- Primary inflows: Heidekampgraben
- Primary outflows: Heidekampgraben

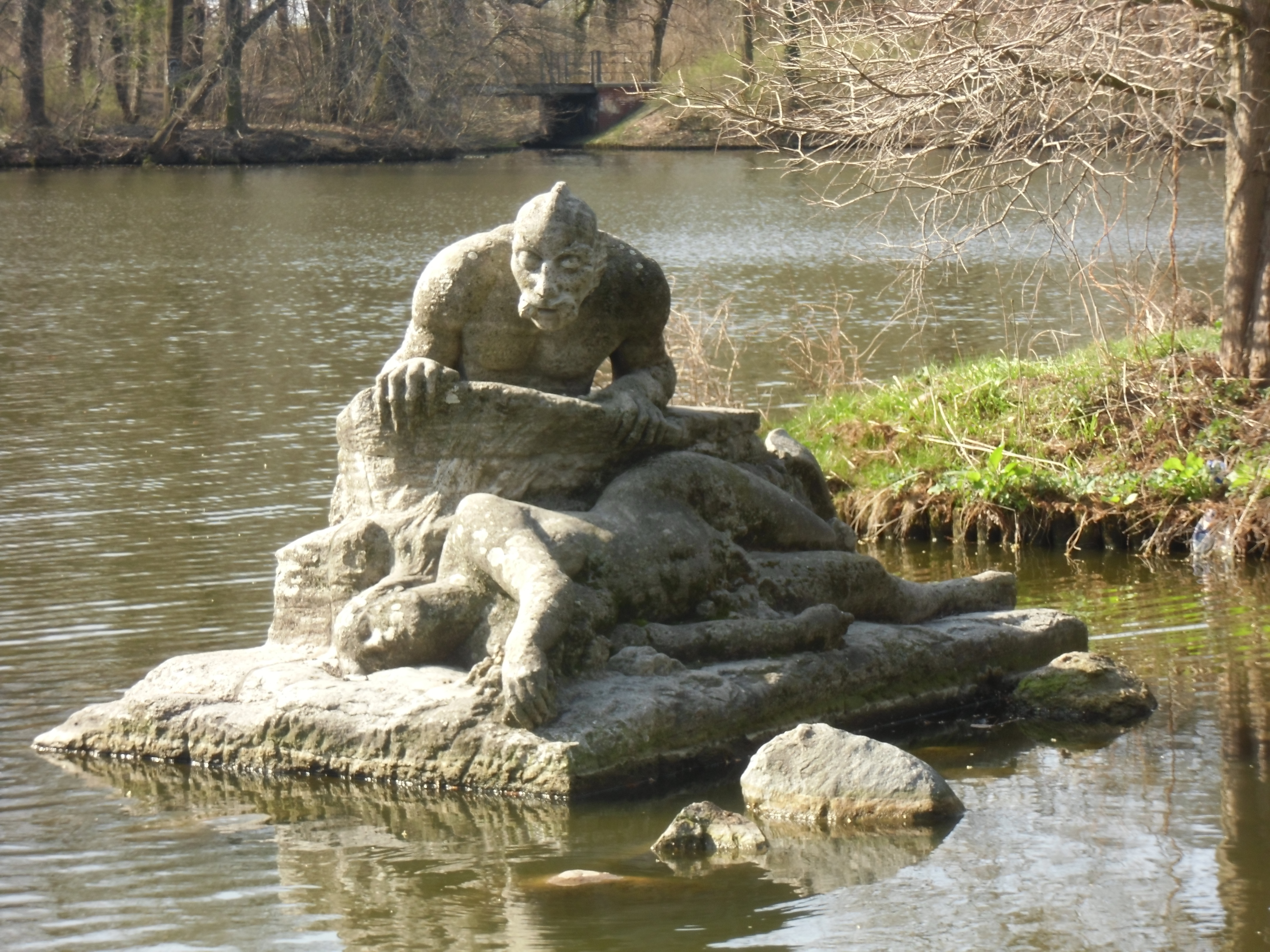
Skulptur Meeresgrund from Otto Petri

The Karpfenteich in Berlin is an artificial body of water in the Berlin district of Alt-Treptow (Treptow-Köpenick district).

The pond is located in Treptower Park south of the Soviet memorial (Sowjetisches Ehrenmal). It was created by Berlin garden architect Gustav Meyer at the end of the 19th century as part of the park's design. He created a playground nearby and used the excavated soil from the pond for this purpose. This was to be fed by the Heidekampgraben ditch, so Meyer had a dam built in the direction of the ditch during the construction work. However, a dismissed worker destroyed it, causing the depression to fill with water and delaying work on the pond. The tenants of the surrounding pubs stocked the pond with carp, giving the previously nameless body of water its current name.

In 1896, the first German colonial exhibition was held around the carp pond as part of the Berlin Trade Exhibition in the imperial German Empire. For this, 106 children, women and men from German colonial territories in Africa and Melanesia were recruited by the imperial government and the colonial authorities using dubious methods, who had to live and act in scenery villages (also contemptuously called Negro villages) by the pond for five and a half months during the exhibition.

In 1907, a shell limestone sculpture by Otto Petri (1860-1942) entitled the see ground was erected in a bay.

In the winter of 2009/2010, most of the fish living in the pond died after large parts of the water froze through. In May 2010, it was therefore decided to introduce young pike into the pond as part of a stocking measure. At the end of October, the stocking was supplemented with tench.

In 2019, settled sludge - mainly from rainwater overflows from nearby road runoff - was removed as part of a remediation measure. The maximum depth is now stated as 2.5 meters on an information board at the pond.

In February 2021, a winter diver died while trying to dive between two ice holes.

No swimming and fishing signs were put up around the lake in April 2021.

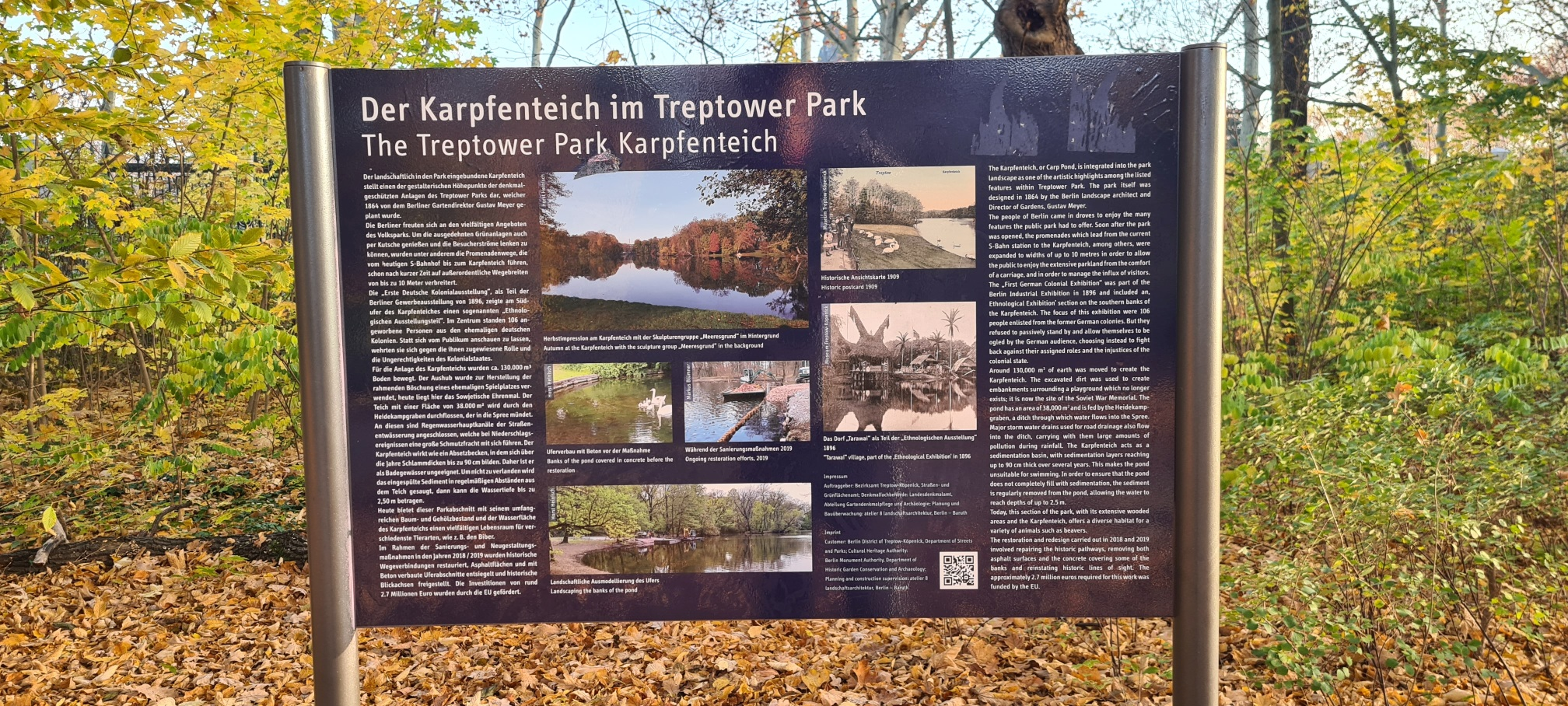
Information board at the Karpfenteich in the Treptower Park, Berlin

== Literature ==
- Dana Schultze and Karin Manke: Streifzüge threw Treptow. Stapp Verlag, Berlin 1996, ISBN 3-87776-932-2, p. 130.
