= Treptower Park =

Park in Berlin

Coordinates: 52°29′18″N 13°28′11″E

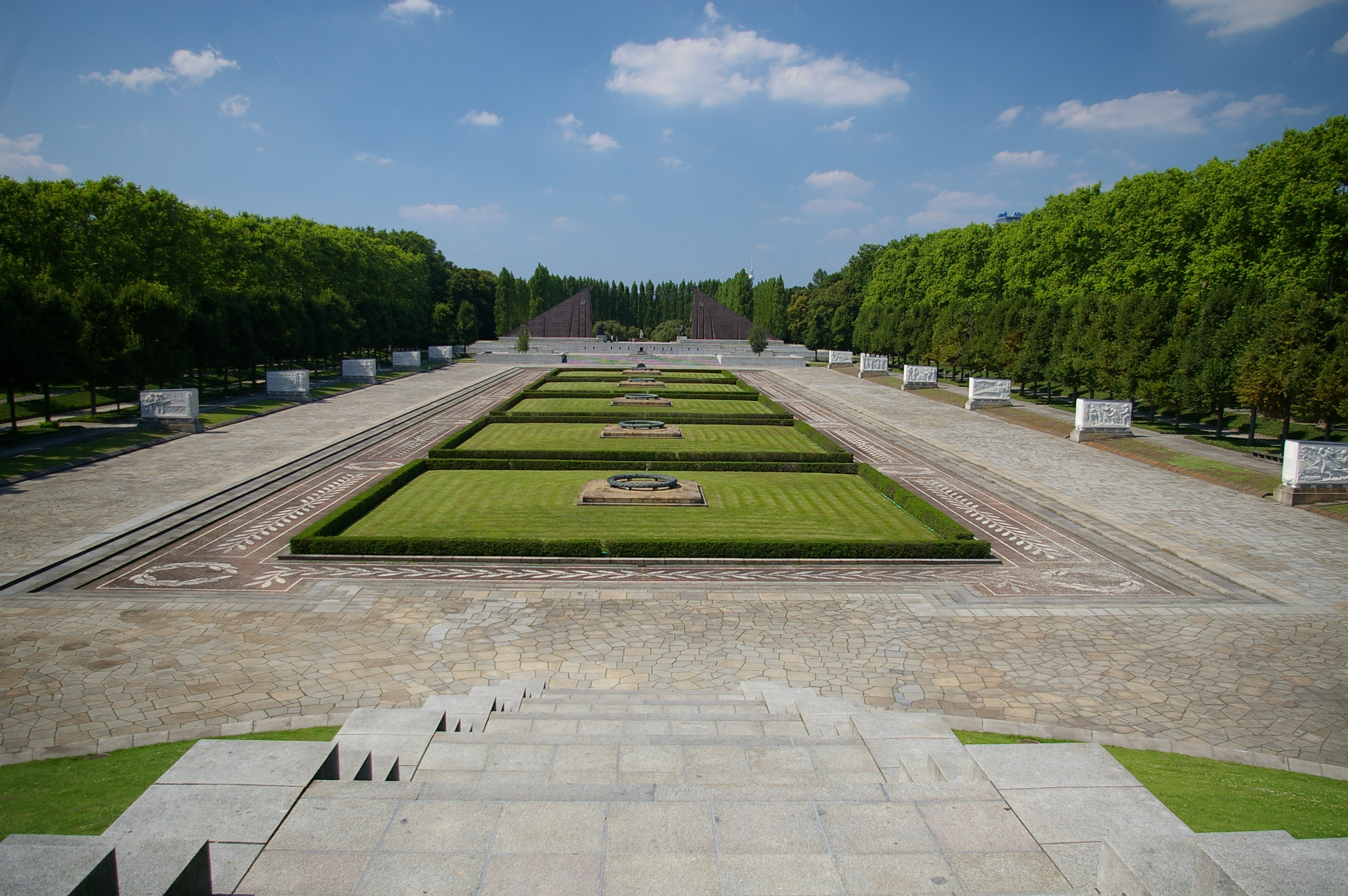
- Interactive map of Treptower Park
- Location: Alt-Treptow, Treptow-Köpenick, Berlin

Treptower Park (pronounced [tʁɛptoːɐ]) is a park alongside the river Spree in Alt-Treptow, in the district of Treptow-Köpenick, south of central Berlin.

== History ==
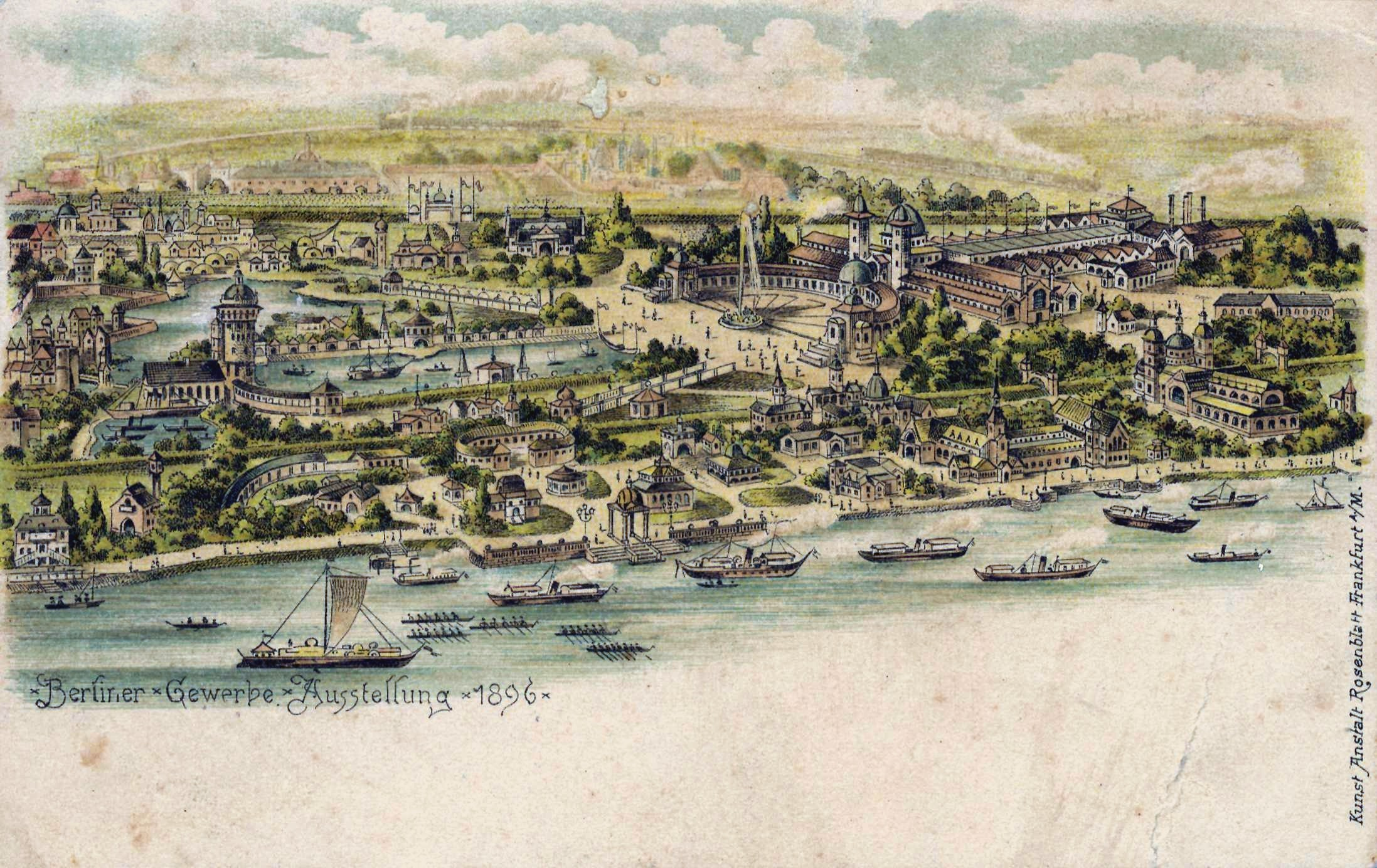
Overview of the park in 1896

It was the location of the Great Industrial Exposition of Berlin in 1896. It is a popular place for recreation of Berliners and a tourist attraction.

During the Cold War, Treptower Park was in East Berlin, on the German Democratic Republic side of the Berlin Wall. On 14 July 1987 it was used by British band Barclay James Harvest for the first ever open-air concert by a western rock band in the German Democratic Republic. In May 1989, the Bethke brothers used the park as an impromptu airstrip for defecting to West Germany by ultralight aircraft.

== Soviet war memorial ==
Its prominent feature is the Soviet War Memorial (sometimes translated as the "Soviet Cenotaph"), built to the design of the Soviet architect Yakov Belopolsky to commemorate the 80,000 Soviet soldiers who fell in the Battle of Berlin in April–May 1945. It was opened four years after the war ended, on May 8, 1949.

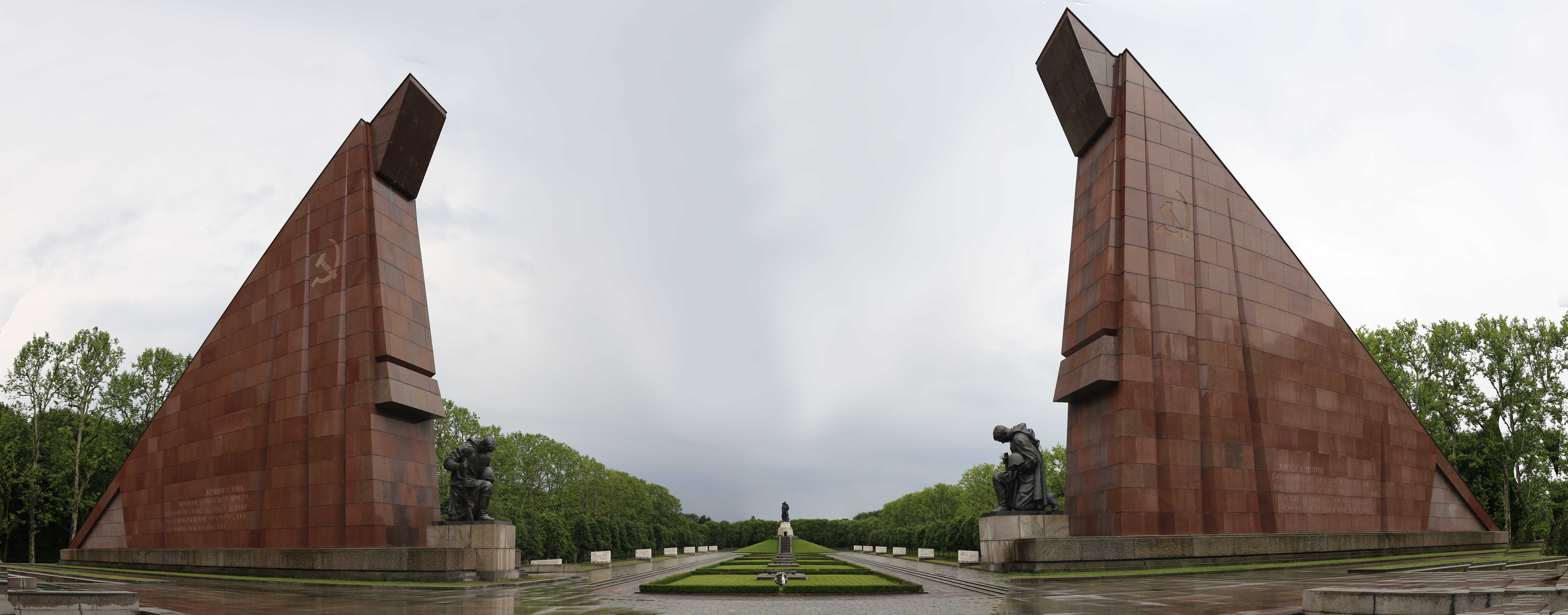
Panoramic view of the Memorial

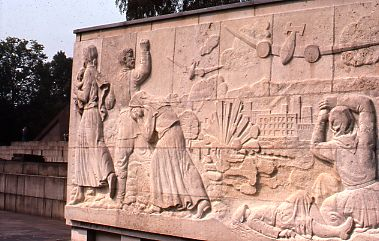
Illustration made in relief as part of Soviet War Memorial in Treptower Park

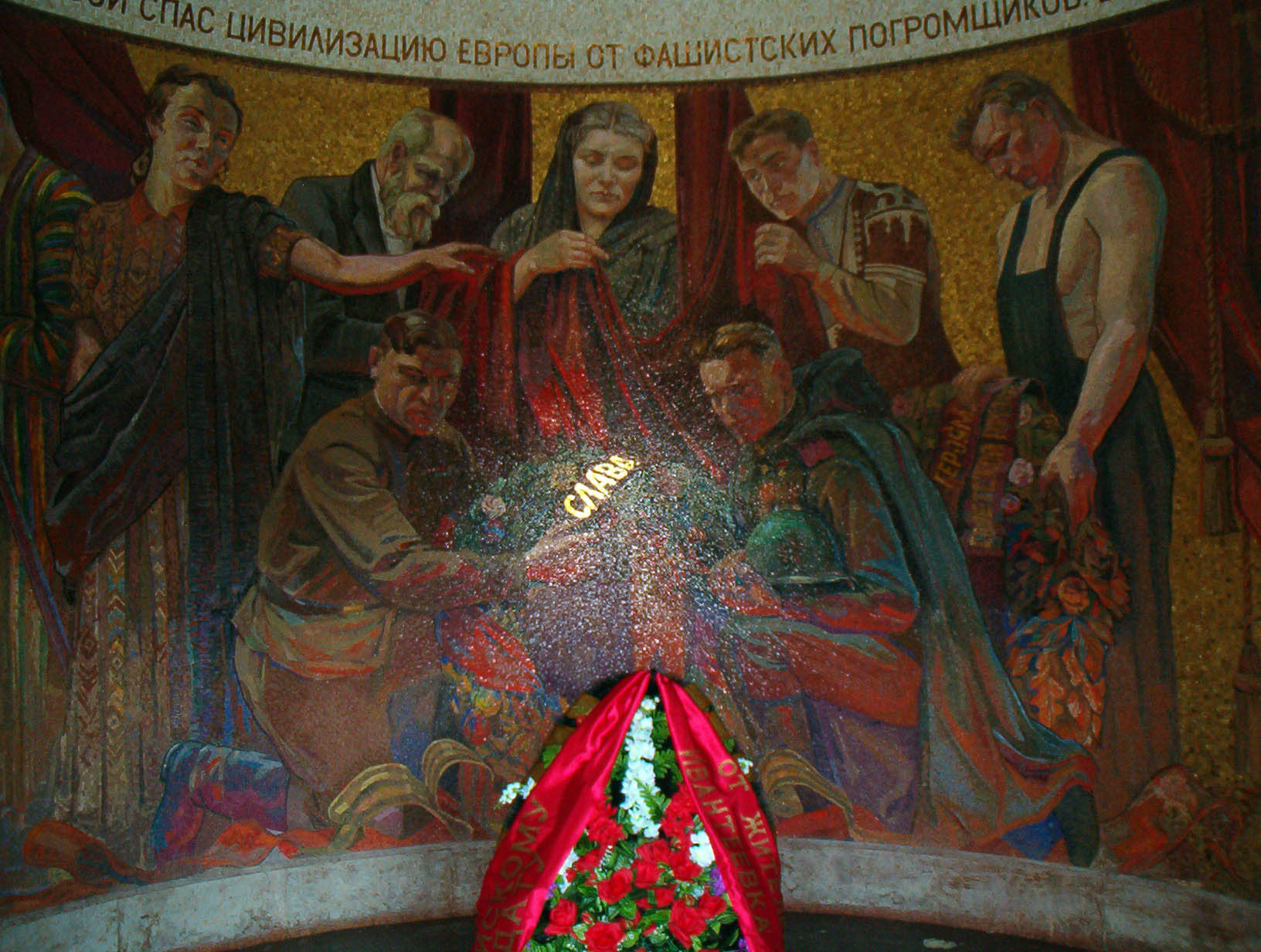
A view into the pedestal of the memorial

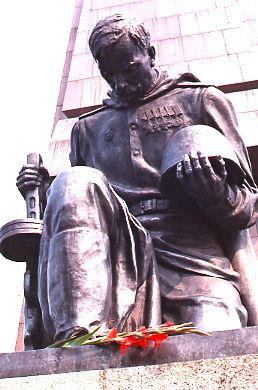
Statue of kneeling Soviet soldier at the memorial

== See also ==
- Klingende Blume
- Karpfenteich (small lake)
