= Klingende Blume =

Sculpture by Achim Kühn in Berlin, Germany

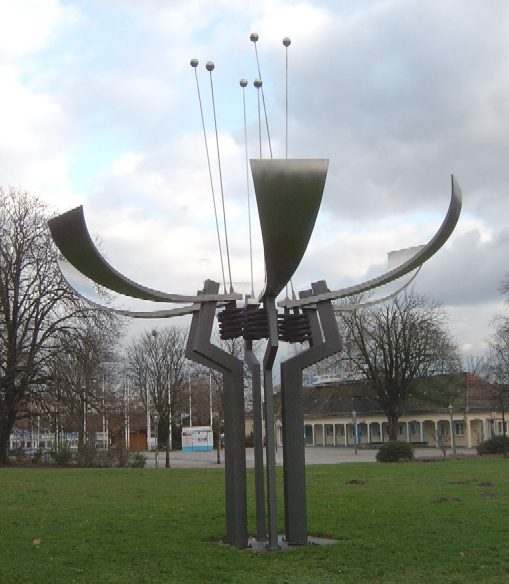
- The sculpture in 2007
- Artist: Achim Kühn
- Location: Berlin, Germany
- 52°29′36″N 13°27′45″E

Klingende Blume is an outdoor sculpture by Achim Kühn, installed at Treptower Park in Berlin, Germany.
