= Fortifications of the inner German border =

East Germany's barriers to prevent its citizens from entering West Germany

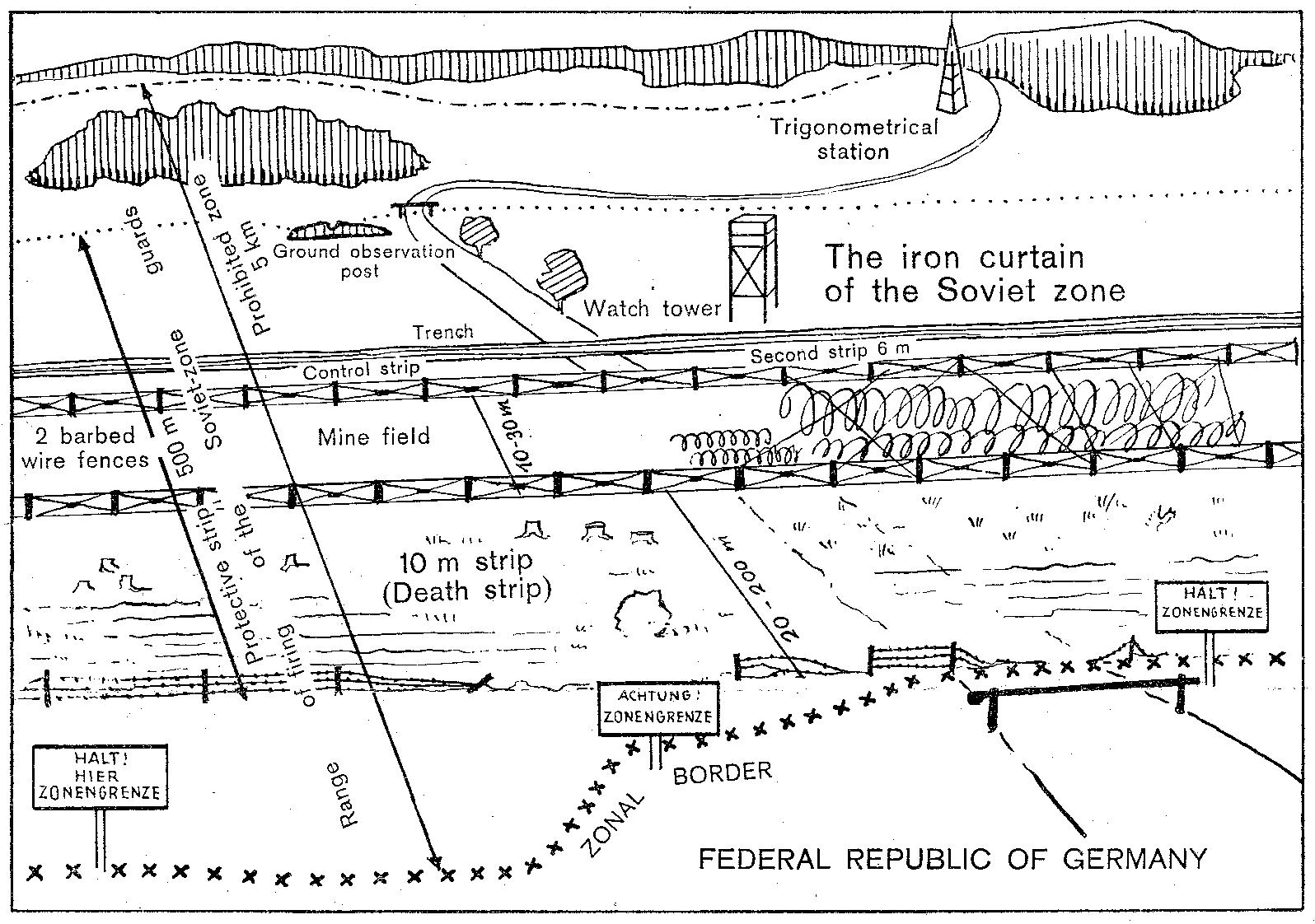
Annotated diagram of the second-generation inner German border system in the early 1960s

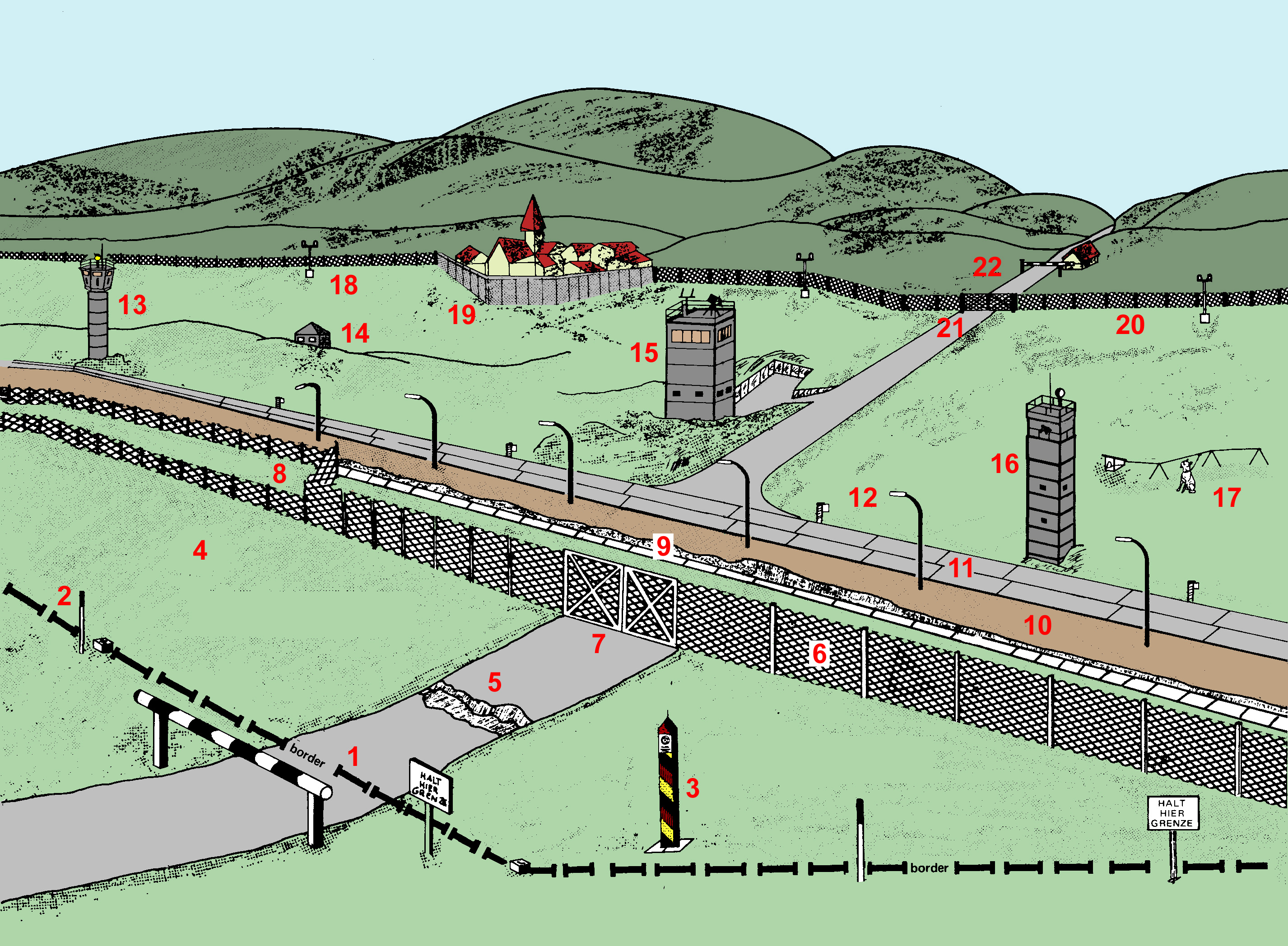
Annotated diagram of the third-generation inner German border system c. 1984, from the West German perspective facing east.

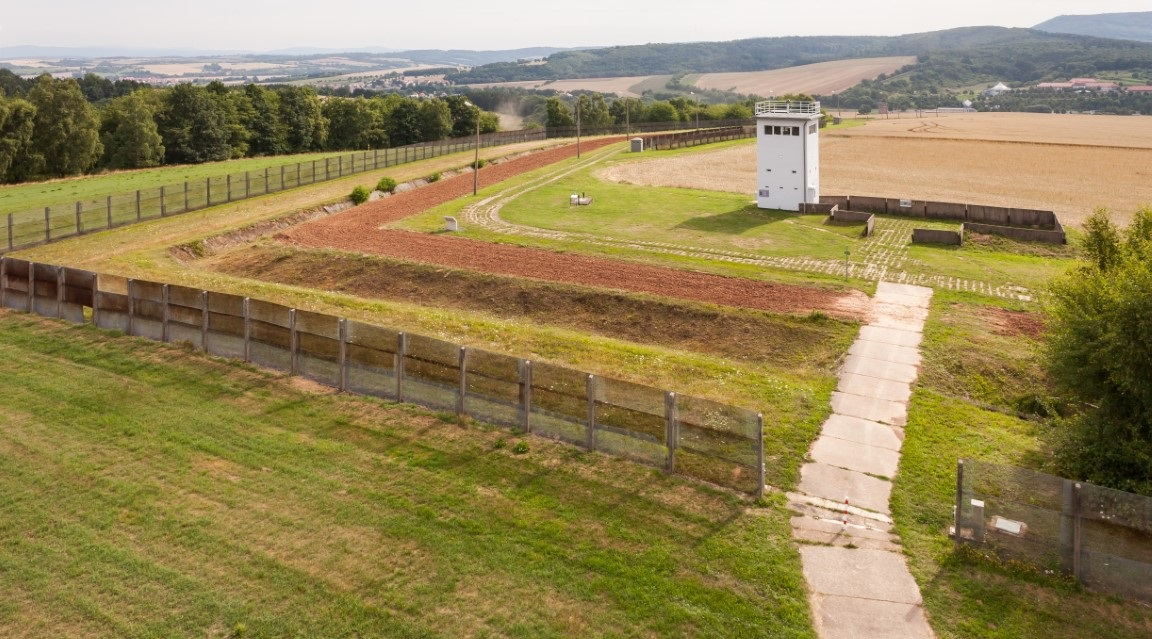
A preserved section of the former inner German border at the Borderland Museum Eichsfeld

The inner German border was a complex system of interlocking fortifications and security zones 1,381 kilometres (858 mi) long and several kilometres deep, running from the Baltic Sea to Czechoslovakia. The outer fences and walls were the most familiar and visible aspect of the system for Western visitors to the border zone, but they were merely the final obstacle for a would-be escapee from East Germany. The complexity of the border system increased steadily until it reached its full extent in the early 1980s. The following description and the accompanying diagram describe the border as it was around 1980.

Travelling notionally from east to west, an escapee would first reach the edge of the restricted zone (Sperrzone), a closely controlled strip of land 5 kilometres (3.1 mi) wide, running parallel with the border. Evading the patrols and watchful inhabitants of the Sperrzone, the escapee would have reached the first of the border fences. The signal fence (Signalzaun), around 500 to 1,000 metres (1,600 to 3,300 ft) from the actual border, was lined with low-voltage electrified barbed wire which activated alarms when touched or cut.

Beyond the signal fence was the "protective strip" (Schutzstreifen). It was brightly lit by floodlights in many places to reduce an escapee's chances of using the cover of darkness. Guard towers, bunkers and dog runs were positioned at frequent intervals to keep a round-the-clock watch over the strip. Crossing the Schutzstreifen, the escapee would next reach the floodlit control strip, often called the "death strip" in the West. Tripwire-activated flare launchers were situated at various points to help the border guards pinpoint the location of an escape attempt. The last and most formidable obstacle was the outer fencing. In some places there were multiple parallel rows of fences, each up to several metres high, with minefields in between. The fences were not electrified but were booby-trapped with directional anti-personnel mines at intervals of 10 metres (33 ft), each one of which was capable of killing at a range of up to 120 metres (390 ft). Finally, the escapee had to cross whatever natural obstacles were on the western side of the border fence as well as traversing a strip of cleared ground that was up to 500 meters (1640 ft) wide. While crossing this outer strip, the escapee would appear in clear view and shooting range of the border guards before reaching the safety of West German territory.

== Restricted zone ==
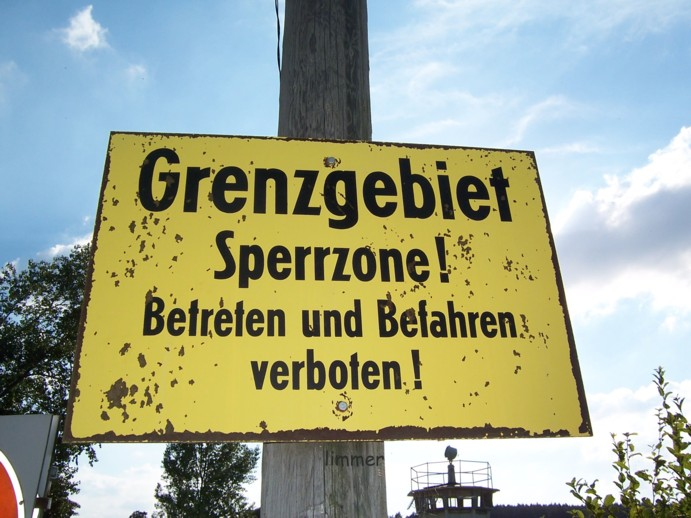
Warning sign on the East German side of the border: Border restriction area! Trespassing and driving prohibited!

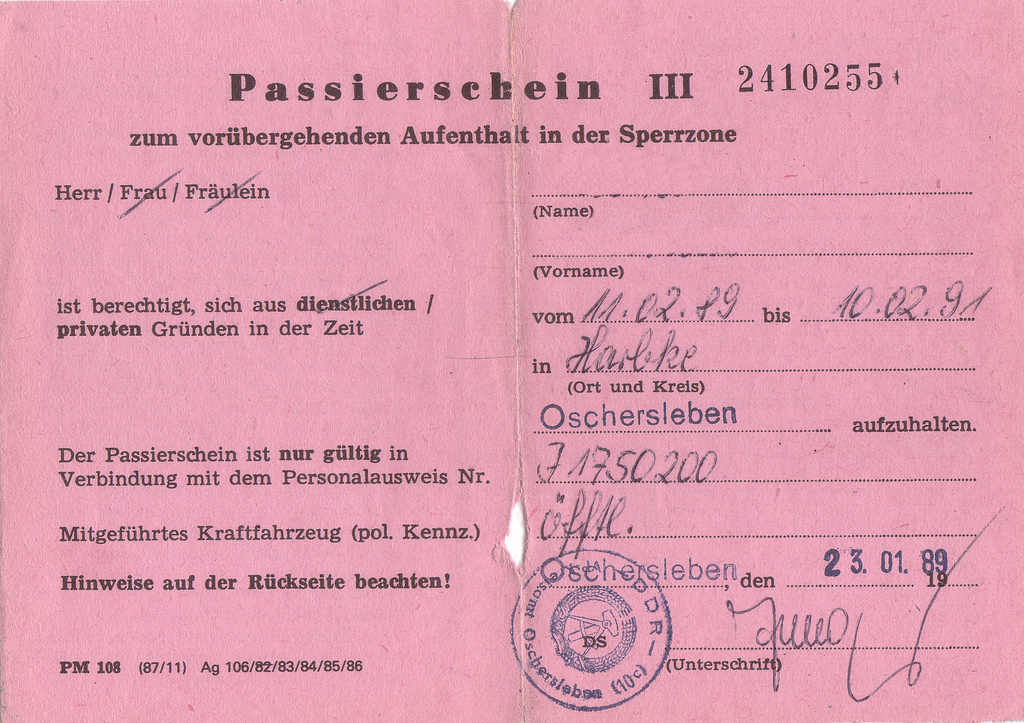
East German permit to access the 5 km wide Sperrzone behind the border

The Sperrzone, a 5 kilometres (3.1 mi) wide area to which access was heavily restricted, was the rear segment of the border defences. When it was established in May 1952, it included a number of villages and valuable agricultural land. Although the land continued to be farmed where possible, many of the inhabitants were expelled on the grounds of political unreliability or simply because they lived inconveniently close to the border line. In some instances, entire villages were razed and the inhabitants relocated far to the east.

Those who remained behind were required to be completely loyal to the regime and support the border guards, helping them by watching for strangers and unfamiliar vehicles. Even so, they had little freedom of movement; special permits were required to enter the zone and farmers worked under close supervision. They could enter and leave the zone an unlimited number of times but could not travel to other villages within the zone. Curfews were imposed to prevent inhabitants from crossing the border under the cover of darkness.

The Sperrzone was not fenced off but was marked with warning signs. The entry roads were controlled by checkpoints (Kontrollpassierpunkte) through which only authorised individuals could pass. The first layer of border fences, the signal fence, lay on the far side of the Sperrzone to control access to the protective strip or Schutzstreifen adjoining the border itself.

== Signal fence ==
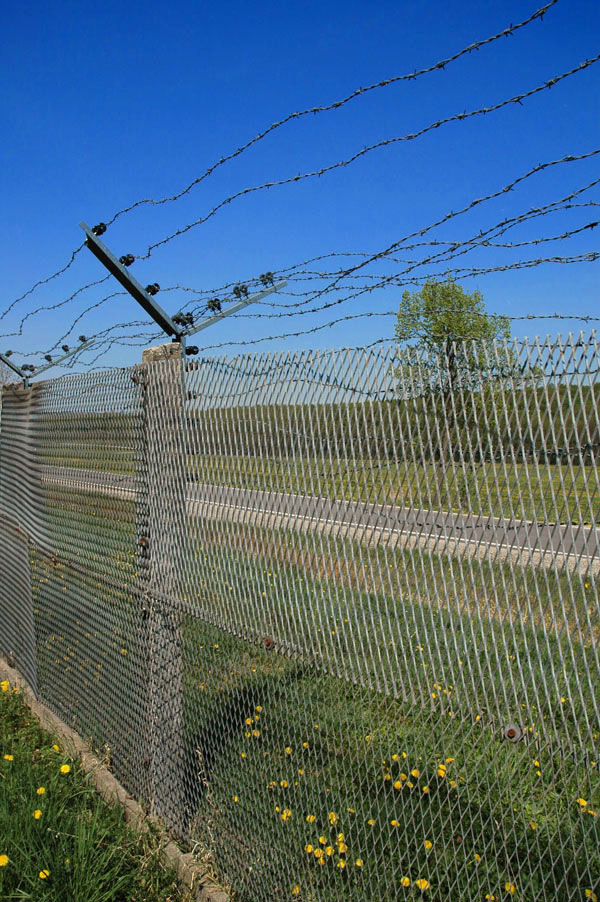
The barbed wire strands on the top of the signal fence activated an alarm when pulled or cut, alerting the border guards.

The signal or "Hinterland" fence (Signalzaun) was the first of the border fences, dividing the Sperrzone from the more heavily guarded protective strip (Schutzstreifen) adjoining the actual border. Its purpose was to provide the guards with an early warning of an escape attempt. The fence itself was not a particularly formidable obstacle, standing only 2 metres (6.6 ft) high. At the top, middle and bottom, rows of electrified barbed wire strands were attached to insulators. Cutting the wires or pulling them out of place resulted in an alarm being activated, alerting the guards to a possible breach of the fence. In practice, though, the border guards found that the fence frequently malfunctioned. The signal fence also had a 2-metre-wide (6.6 ft) control strip on its eastern side. The fence was built on open high ground wherever possible, to ensure that intruders would be silhouetted against the sky and thus be more easily spotted. By mid-1989, 1,185 kilometres (736 mi) of signal fencing had been constructed along the border.

== Watchtowers and bunkers ==
The border defences were monitored from hundreds of watchtowers regularly spaced along the Schutzstreifen. Initially they were simple wooden huts mounted on legs between 4 and 12 metres (13 and 39 ft) high, usually constructed from locally sourced timber. Most were replaced with concrete watchtowers from the late 1960s onwards in conjunction with the upgrading of the border defences.

By 1989, there were 529 concrete towers along the length of the inner German border and a further 155 towers of steel and wood construction, as well as various little-used observation platforms in trees. The concrete towers were prefabricated from sections that could be assembled within a few days. Their height could be varied by reducing the number of sections as required. They were connected to an electricity supply and telephone line and were equipped with a powerful 1,000-watt searchlight (Suchscheinwerfer) on the roof that could be directed at targets in any position around the watchtower. The windows could be opened to enable the guards to open fire without leaving the tower. In addition, the towers had firing ports emplaced in the side walls below the guard compartment.

The towers were principally of three types:

- The BT-11 (Beobachtungsturm-11, "Observation Tower-11") was introduced in 1969. Standing 11 metres (36 ft) high on a concrete platform, it was constructed of eleven interlocking 1-metre-wide (3.3 ft) circular segments with walls 2.5 centimetres (1 in) thick. The guards were stationed in an octagonal observation compartment at the top, which was accessed via a steel ladder running up the inside of the column. Each face had a firing port below the windows. The tower's top-heavy construction made it unstable and there were incidents of BT-11s collapsing in high winds or after heavy rain had softened the ground under the foundations. On the Baltic coast, where 27 BT-11s were constructed to overlook the East German seaboard, the towers had to be evacuated in force 6 (50 kilometres per hour (31 mph)) winds.
- The BT-9 (Beobachtungsturm-9, "Observation Tower-9") was introduced from the mid-1970s to remedy the defects of the BT-11. It was constructed in a similar fashion but its square 2 by 2 metres (6.6 ft × 6.6 ft) profile and lower height, at 9 metres (30 ft), made it more stable. The four-sided guard compartment at the top had distinctive copper-tinted windows. Each face of the tower had a firing port on the stage below the guard compartment.
- The Führungsstelle or Kommandoturm ("command tower") was a shorter and rarer type of tower that served as the command centre of a border sector. It contained monitoring and control equipment to open border gates remotely, turn on and off fence lighting and alert lights, rotate searchlights and so on. Disturbances of the signal wire and detonations of SM-70 booby-trap mines would be detected by the command tower. The towers were topped with long-range radio antennae to communicate via R-105 radio to other units. A distinctive feature of this type of tower was the prominent air intake box at ground level.

Around a thousand observation bunkers also stood along the length of the border. Most common was a small concrete bunker known as an "earth bunker" (Erdbunker), usually recessed into a depression in the ground with a view along the guard road and border fence. It was constructed from two base sections, each 0.8 metres (2.6 ft) high with a cross-section of 1.8 by 1.8 metres (5.9 ft × 5.9 ft). It terminated in a third section that had two firing ports in the front side and one or two on each of the other sides. The roof was a separate component nesting on top of the concrete bunker, which could accommodate up to two soldiers.

East German border watchtowers and bunkers
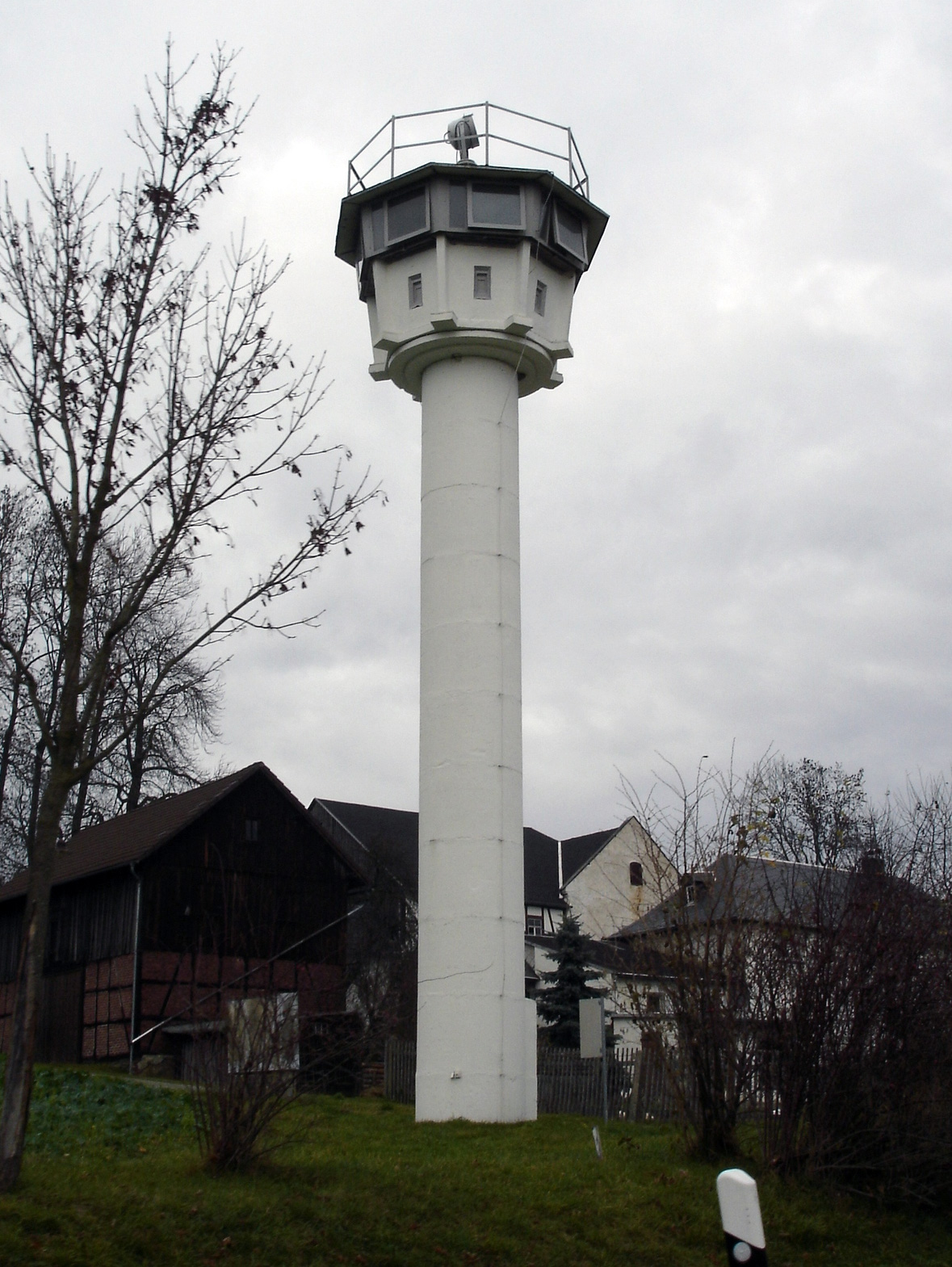
The BT-11 (Beobachtungsturm-11), an 11-metre-high (36 ft) observation tower introduced in 1969

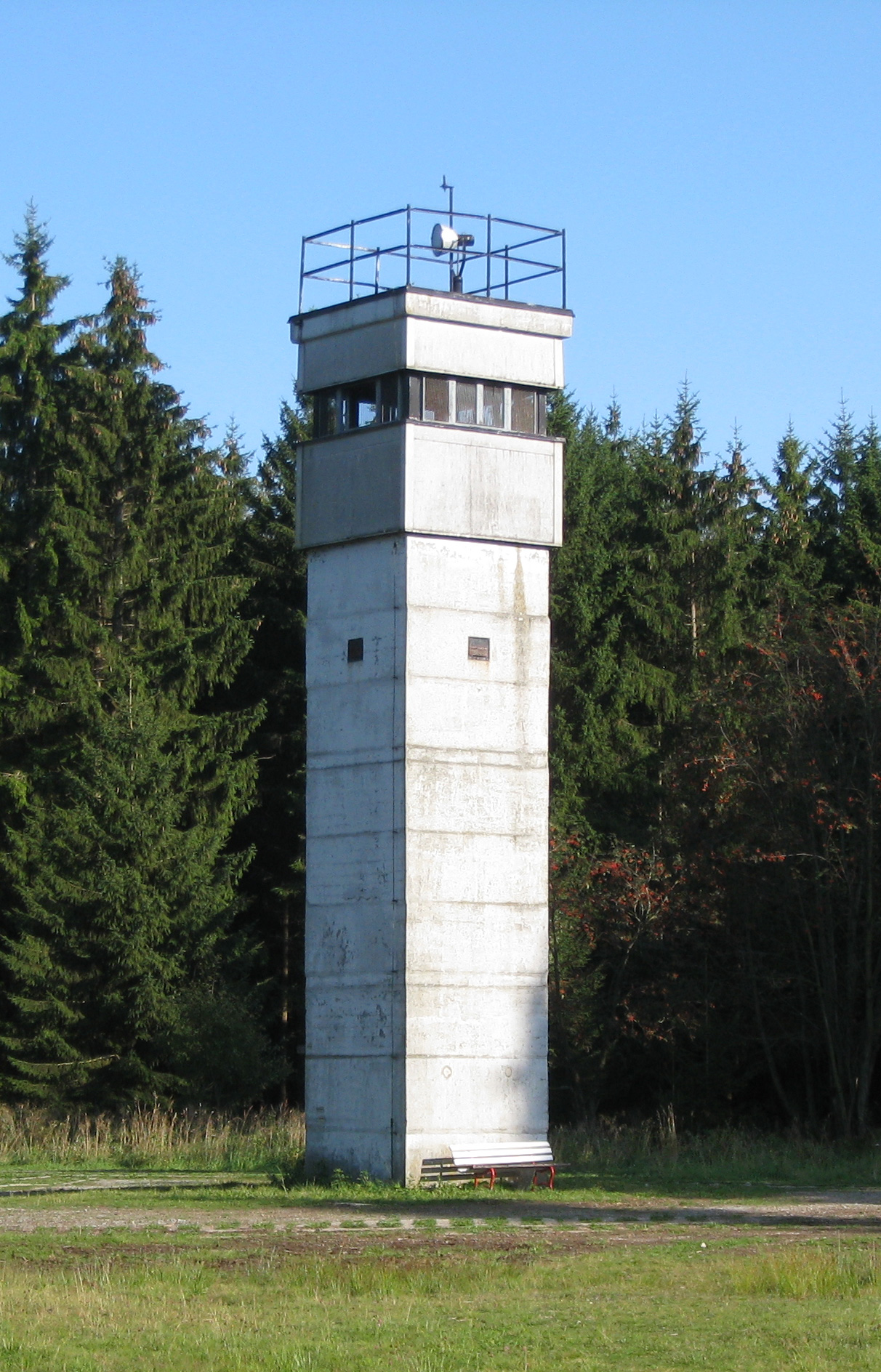
The BT-9 (Beobachtungsturm-9), a 9-metre-high (30 ft) observation tower introduced in the mid-1970s

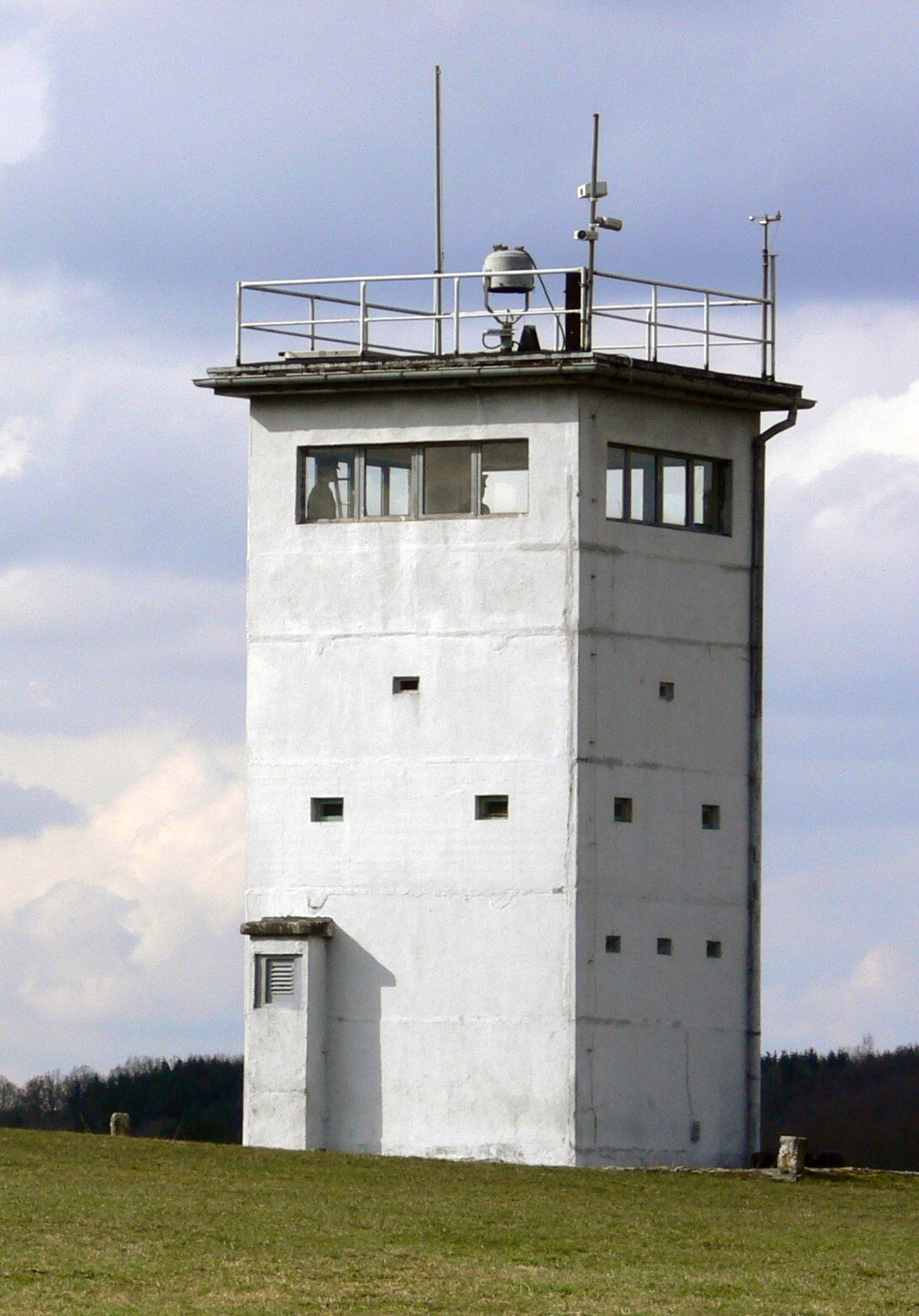
A Führungsstelle or Kommandoturm, a 6-metre-high (20 ft) tower which doubled as an observation tower and command centre

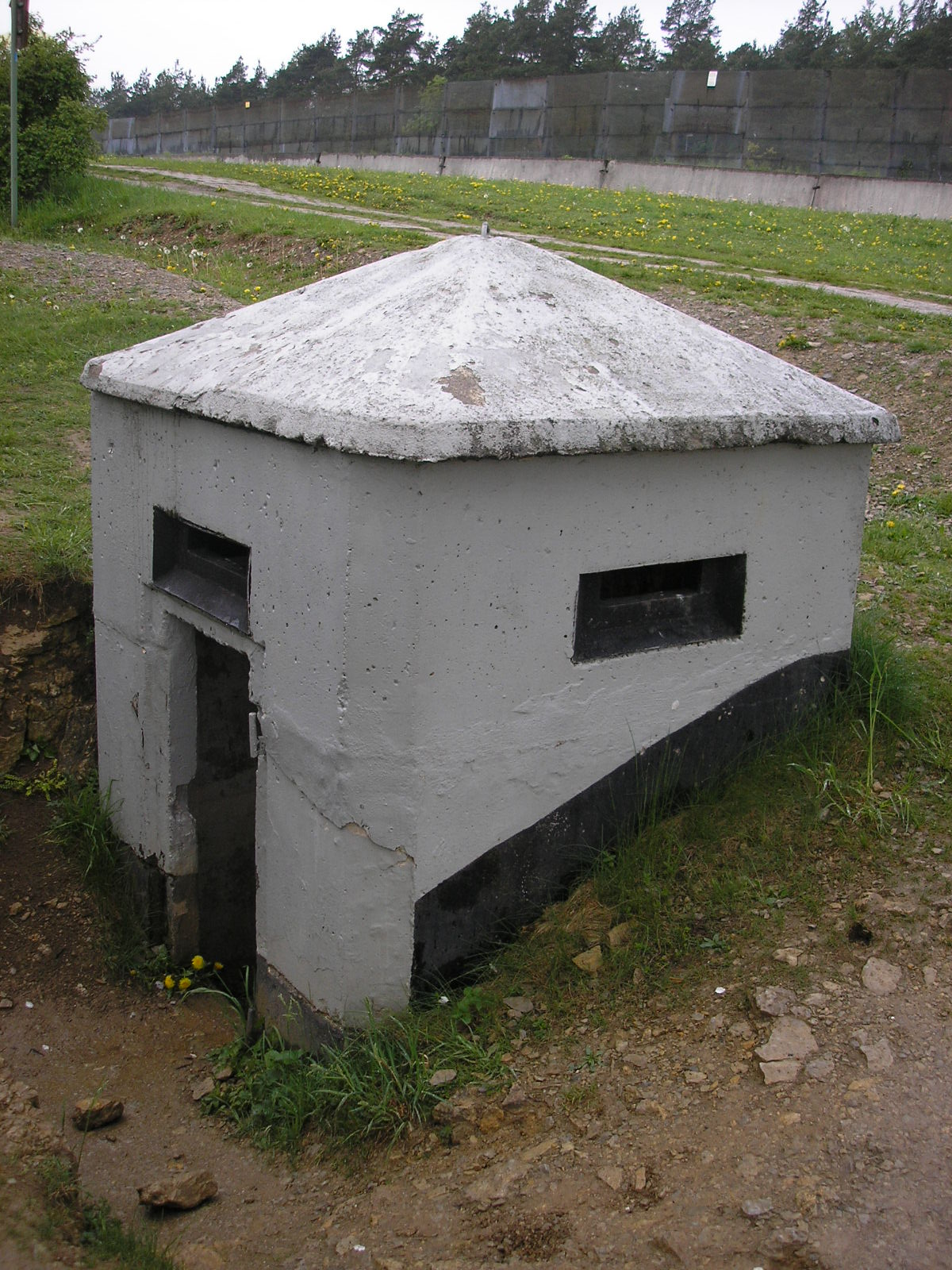
An observation bunker, known as an Erdbunker, preserved at Observation Post Alpha

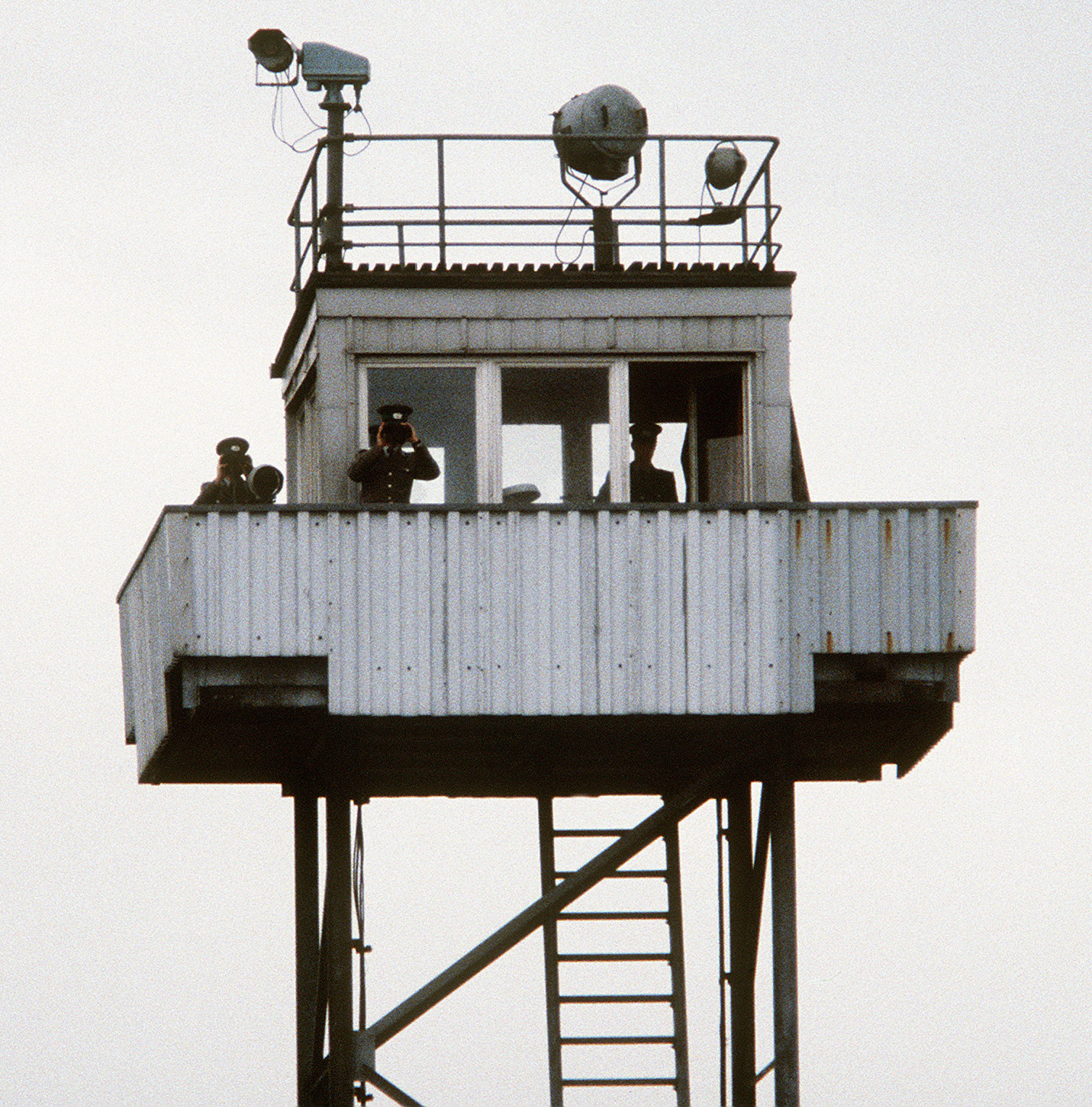
One of the rarer steel observation towers, manned by three GDR border guards

== Guard dogs ==
Dog runs (Kettenlaufanlagen) were installed along high-risk sectors of the border. The dogs were generally chained to steel cables up to 100 metres (330 ft) long. The dogs were occasionally turned loose in temporary pens adjoining gates or damaged sections of the fence. By the 1970s, there were 315 dog runs with 460 dogs. This figure increased steadily until a total length of 71.5 kilometres (44.4 mi) of dog runs had been installed by mid-1989, with 2,500 dogs employed as watchdogs and another 2,700 so-called "horse dogs".

== Patrol roads ==
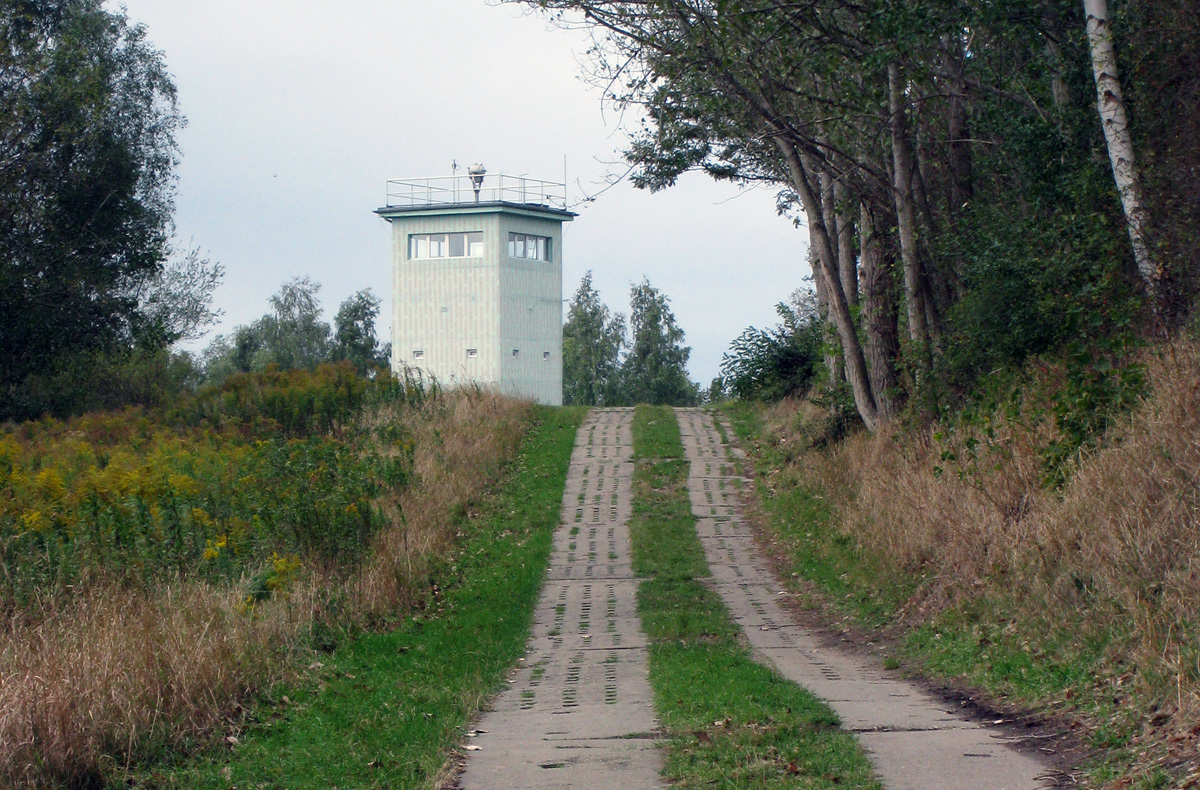
The patrol road or Kolonnenweg at Hötensleben

Rapid access to all parts of the border line was required to ensure a quick response to escape attempts. This was initially a problem for the East Germans, as few patrol roads existed along the border in its early years. Patrols typically used a footpath that ran inside of the fence, alongside the control strip.

When the "modern frontier" was constructed in the late 1960s, an all-weather patrol road (Kolonnenweg, literally "convoy path") was laid down to enable the guards to travel rapidly to any point along the border fence. It consisted of two parallel lines of perforated concrete blocks, each block measuring approximately 0.75 metres (2.5 ft) wide and 2.5 metres (8.2 ft) long. The blocks were pierced with four rows of rectangular concrete drainage holes. In some places they were laid crosswise to provide a continuous roadway. They were also occasionally used as foundation stones for structures such as towers and revetments and to create foundations on which towers were constructed.

The Kolonnenweg usually ran between the control strip (on the border side) and the watchtowers (on the inland side). Around 900 kilometres (560 mi) of patrol roads were built along the border, of which around 130 kilometres (81 mi) was fully paved. In addition to the main Kolonnenweg, there were numerous short access roads built through forests and fields in the Schutzstreifen. Constructed from the same perforated concrete as the Kolonnenweg, these gave the border guards rapid access from the hinterland to the border line. Some civilians were permitted to use these access roads for forestry or farm work, though only with special permission.

== Control strips ==
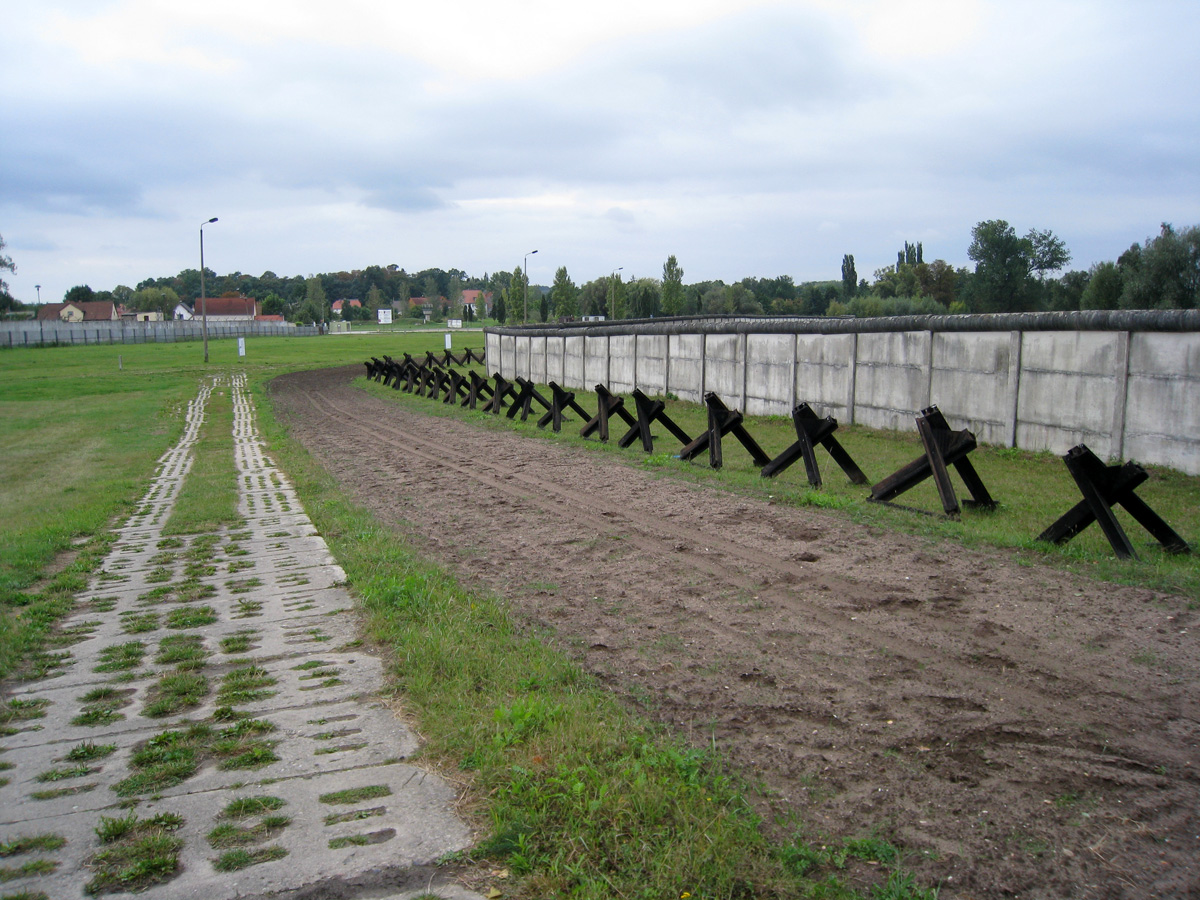
Preserved section of the primary control strip at Hötensleben, with the guards' road on the left and the border wall on the right

The control strips (Kontrollstreifen) were lines of bare earth running parallel to the border fences. They were not an obstacle as such but provided a simple and effective way for the border guards to monitor unauthorised travel across the border. It was almost impossible to cross the strip without leaving footprints, enabling the border guards to identify otherwise undetected escape attempts. They could learn how many individuals had crossed, where escape attempts were being made, and at which times of day escapees were active. From this information, the border guards were able to determine where and when patrols needed to be increased, where improved surveillance from watchtowers and bunkers was required, and which areas needed additional fortifications.

There were two control strips, both located on the inward-facing sides of the border fences. The secondary "K2" strip, 2 metres (6.6 ft) wide, ran alongside the signal fence to the rear of the Schutzstreifen, while the primary "K6" strip, 6 metres (20 ft) wide, ran along the inside of the border fence or wall. The K6 strip ran almost uninterrupted along the entire length of the border. Where it ran across roads, the road surface would be ripped up to make way for the control strip; where the border ran along streams and rivers, the strip was constructed parallel with the waterways. In places where the border was prone to escape attempts, the control strip was illuminated at night by high-intensity floodlights (Beleuchtungsanlage) installed on concrete poles, which were also used at vulnerable points such as rivers and streams crossing the border. The strip was patrolled several times a day by guards, who would inspect it carefully for signs of intrusion.

In the West, the control strip became known as the "death strip" (Todesstreifen) because of the shoot-to-kill orders given to the border guards. The East Germans preferred to call it by the more euphemistic name of the "action strip" (Handlungsstreifen). It was also nicknamed the Pieck-Allee ("Pieck Avenue") after East Germany's president Wilhelm Pieck (1949–60).

The Soviets had pioneered the use of control strips on the borders of the USSR. The same technique was adapted for use in Germany when the border was first fortified from May 1952 onwards, at a time when it was still policed by Soviet troops. The construction of the control strip in 1952 was carried out by local villagers conscripted into work brigades. One of those involved, a resident of the Thuringian village of Kella, later recalled:

The tree stumps were blown up, and there wasn't enough soil left over so they had to carry dirt up [the hill] in baskets. They also had to bring all sorts of gardening tools with them. The ten-metre strip was made into something like cultivated garden soil – so that you could see every footprint, every impression. And it was patrolled regularly ... usually by three [officers]."

The control strips were later maintained by a specialist engineering corps, the Grenzpioniere. They used 3-metre-wide (9.8 ft) harrows towed by KT-50 bulldozers and copious quantities of herbicide to keep the strip free of vegetation.

== Anti-vehicle barriers ==
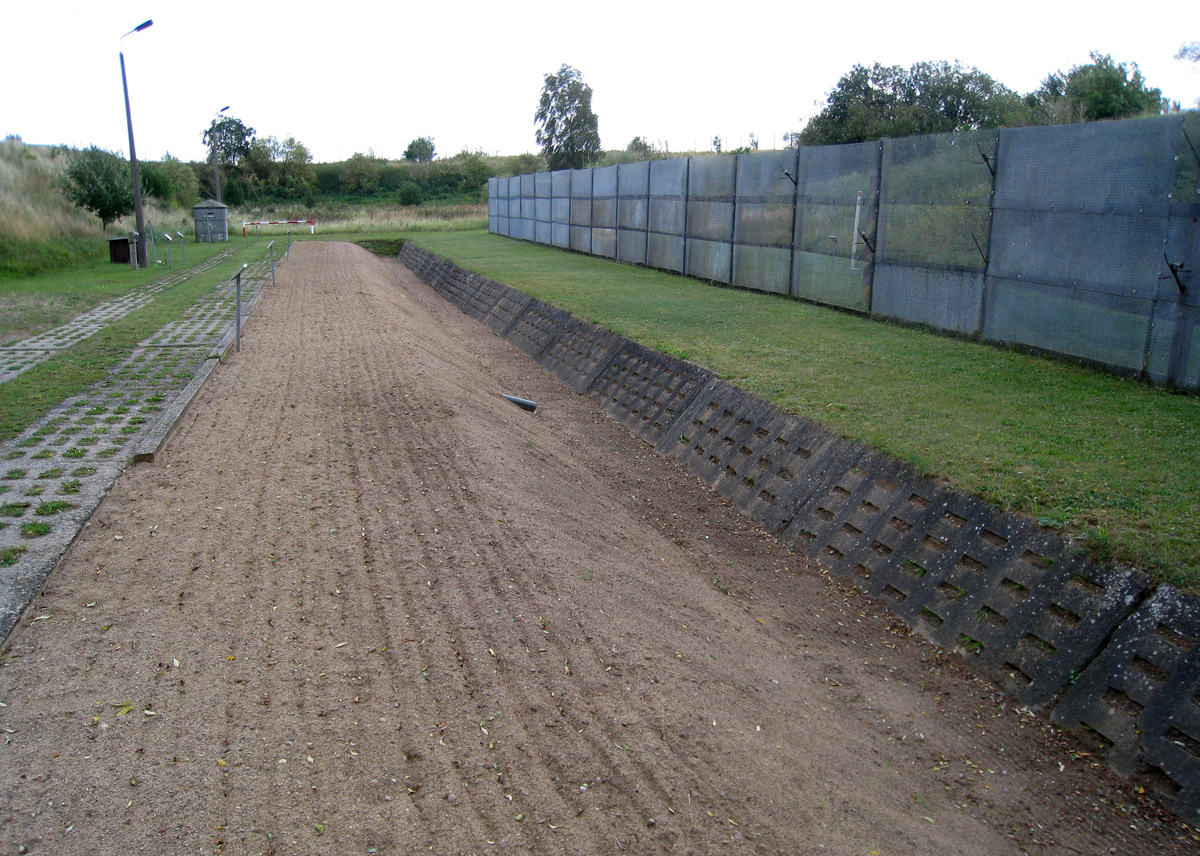
Control strip and anti-vehicle ditch.

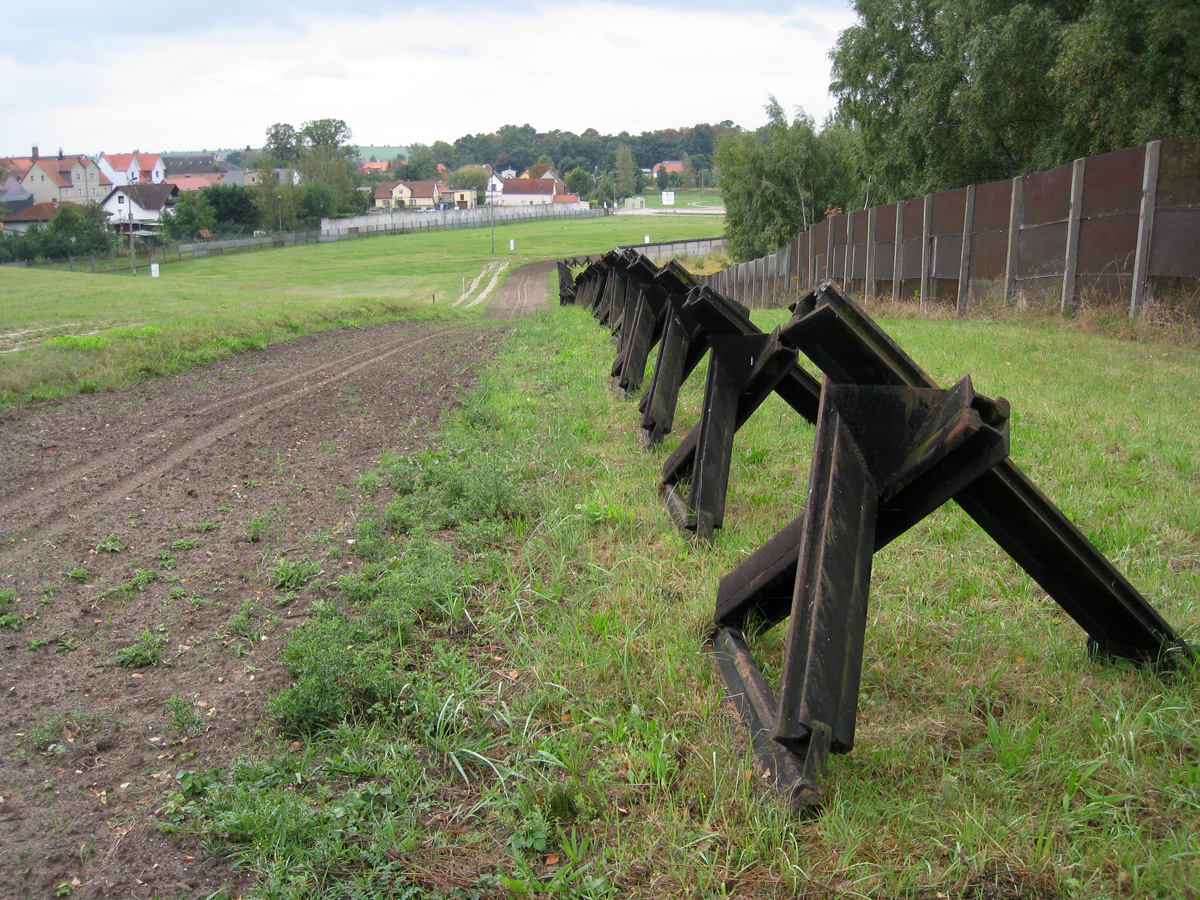
Czech hedgehog obstacle defences at Hötensleben

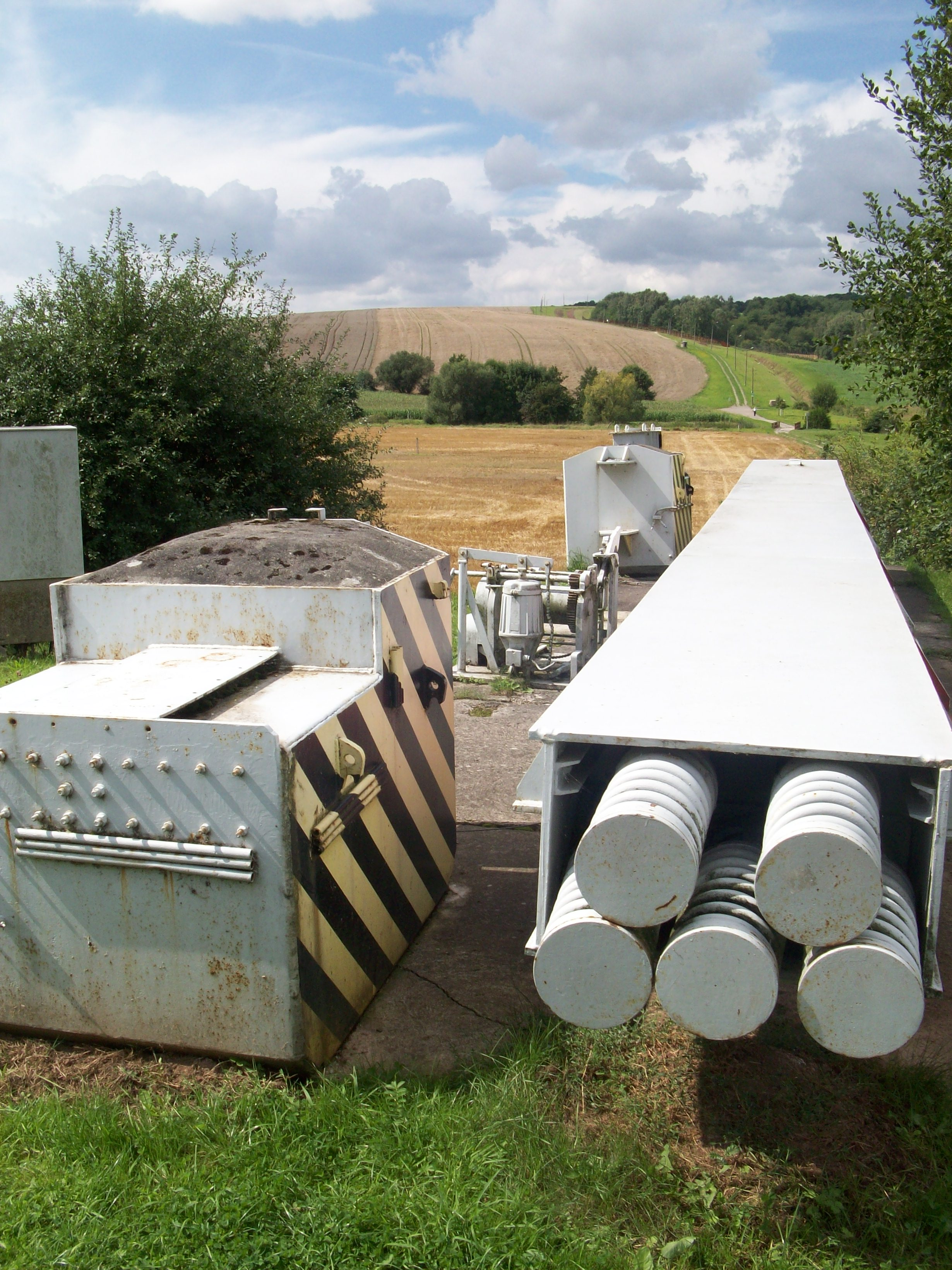
Anti-vehicle barrier at the Borderland Museum Eichsfeld. The barrier was placed at the roadside and could be moved to the street quickly to prevent vehicles from crossing unallowed.

Anti-vehicle barriers along the inner German border grew increasingly impenetrable throughout its existence. In the early days, the East Germans blocked border crossings by simply tearing up the road surface, digging ditches and using the earth and rubble to build ramparts that physically blocked the carriageways. These were then enhanced with wire and wooden posts. As border fortifications developed into permanent barriers, purpose-built obstacles became standard. The most common types were Czech hedgehogs (Panzersperre) or cheval de frise (Stahligel or "steel hedgehogs"). These anti-vehicle devices were constructed from three or four pairs of 1.5-metre-long (4.9 ft) rails welded together to form a steel obstacle weighing over 500 kilograms (1,100 lb) – heavy enough to stop a motor vehicle from pushing them aside. Distributed at intervals narrow enough to prevent even the smallest East German vehicle, such as Trabants, from passing between them, they became a common sight along the entire inner German border and the Berlin Wall.

Rows of anti-vehicle ditches, or Kraftfahrzeug Sperrgraben (KFZ-Sperrgraben), were built during the era of the "modern frontier". These lined 829 kilometres (515 mi) of the border and were absent only where natural obstacles such as streams, rivers, gullies or thick forests made such barriers unnecessary. The ditches were constructed as a V-shaped cut about 0.8 metres (2.6 ft) deep, with a steeply sloping western edge and shallow eastern edge. The western edge was faced with concrete slabs that were 15 centimetres (5.9 in) deep. They proved to be an extremely effective obstacle, preventing almost any type of vehicle from crossing.

== Outer fences and walls ==
The border fences were constructed in a number of phases, starting with the initial fortification of the border from May 1952. The first-generation were crudely built barbed-wire fences (Stacheldrahtzäune) standing between 1.2 and 2.5 metres (3.9 and 8.2 ft) high. The fence was overlooked by watchtowers located at strategic intervals along the border. It was, however, a flawed obstacle. In some places it was so poorly constructed or maintained that livestock was able to wander unhindered across the border. In a few places, gaps were purposefully left with lowered gate poles in front of them and anti-vehicle Czech hedgehog barricades behind.

The fences were strengthened in the late 1950s, particularly in areas with a high number of escapes. Parallel rows of barbed-wire fences were built, with concertina wire added between the fences in some places to further hinder escapees. The outer fence was often located very close to the actual border. A further obstacle was added by placing short wooden anchor posts about 2 metres (6.6 ft) outwards from both fences. Barbed wire was strung between them to form a V-shape to hinder lateral movement by escapees. In some low-risk areas, only a single fence was installed.

East German border fences and walls
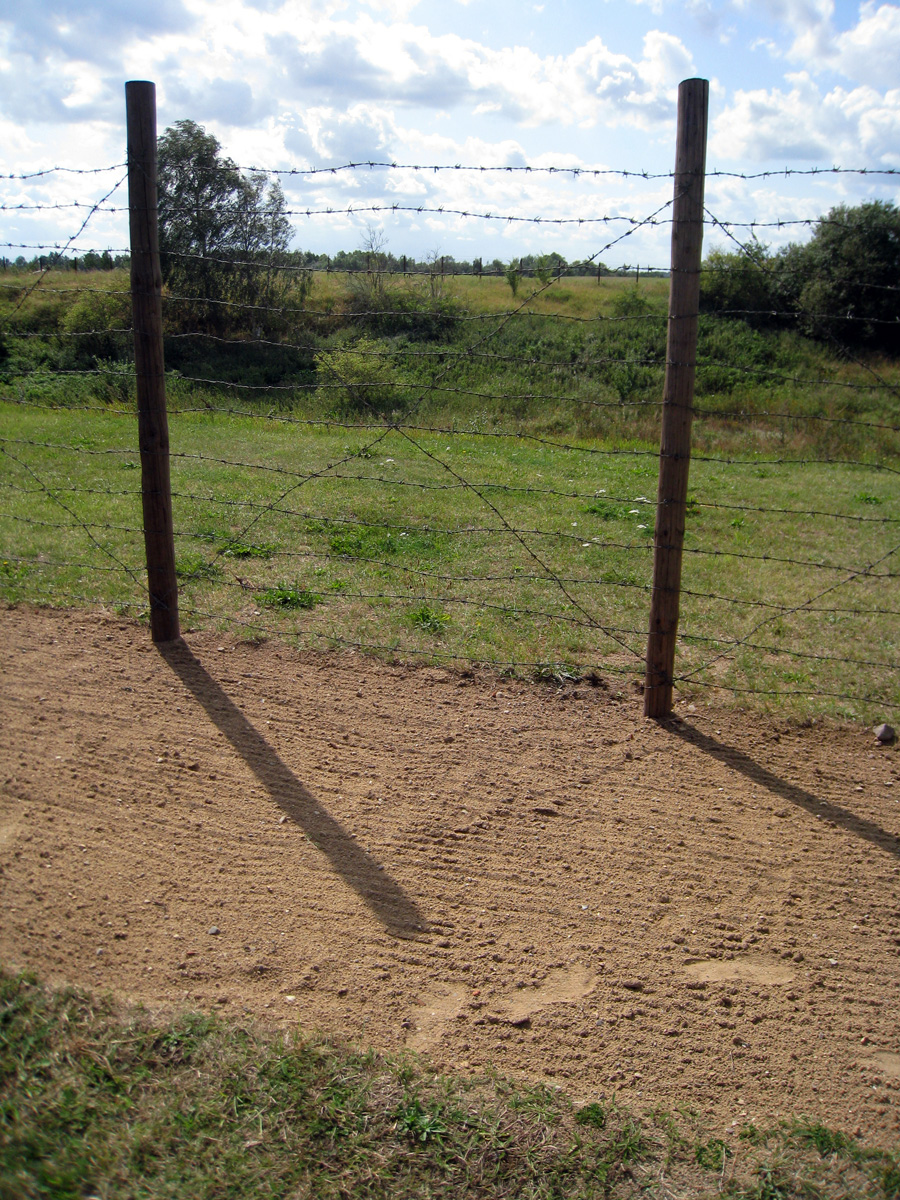
Reconstruction of the "first generation" border fence as erected in 1952, with control strip in the foreground

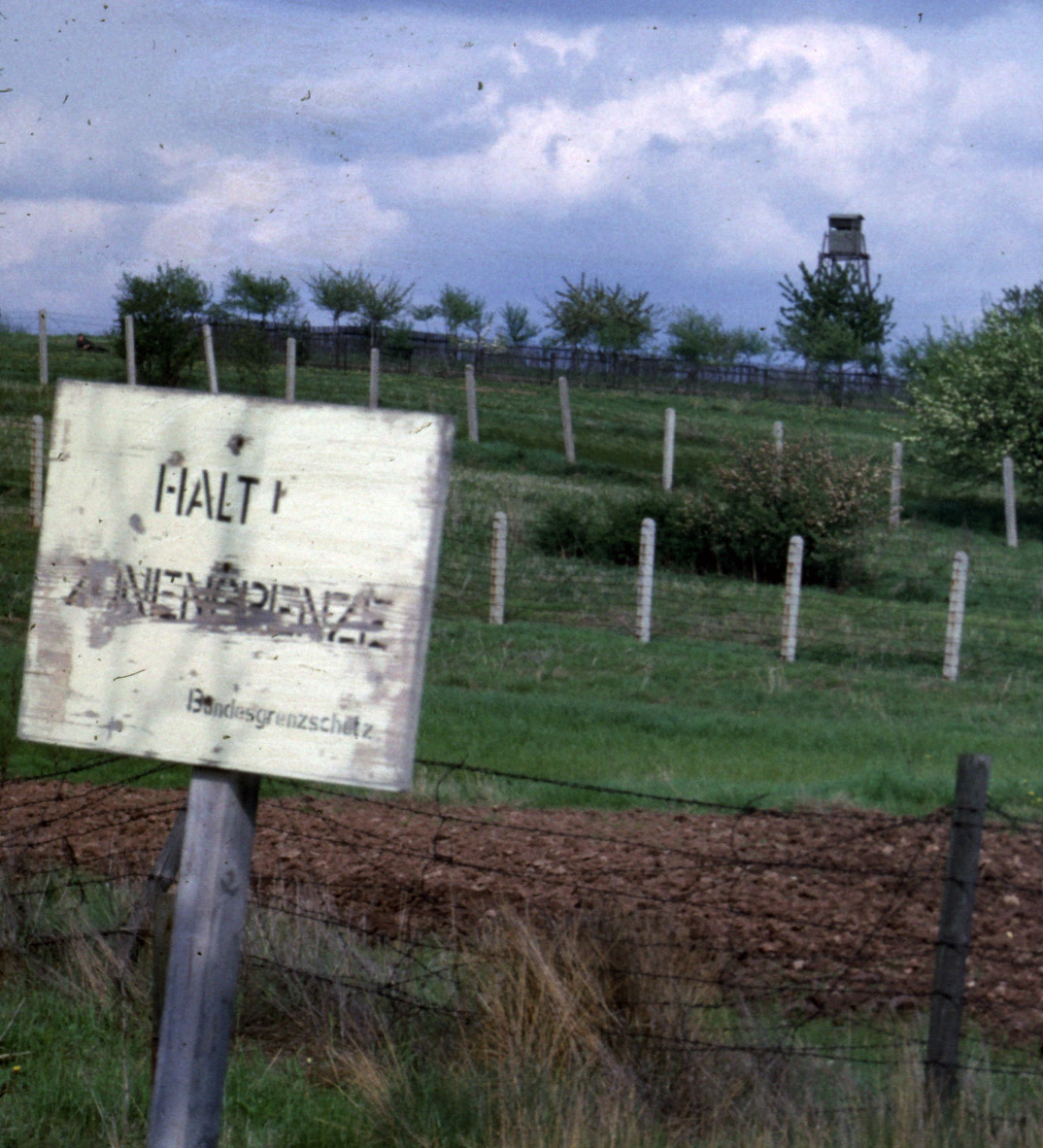
The "second generation" border fences in 1962, with derelict barbed wire in the foreground, a control strip, two rows of barbed wire further back and a watchtower at the rear

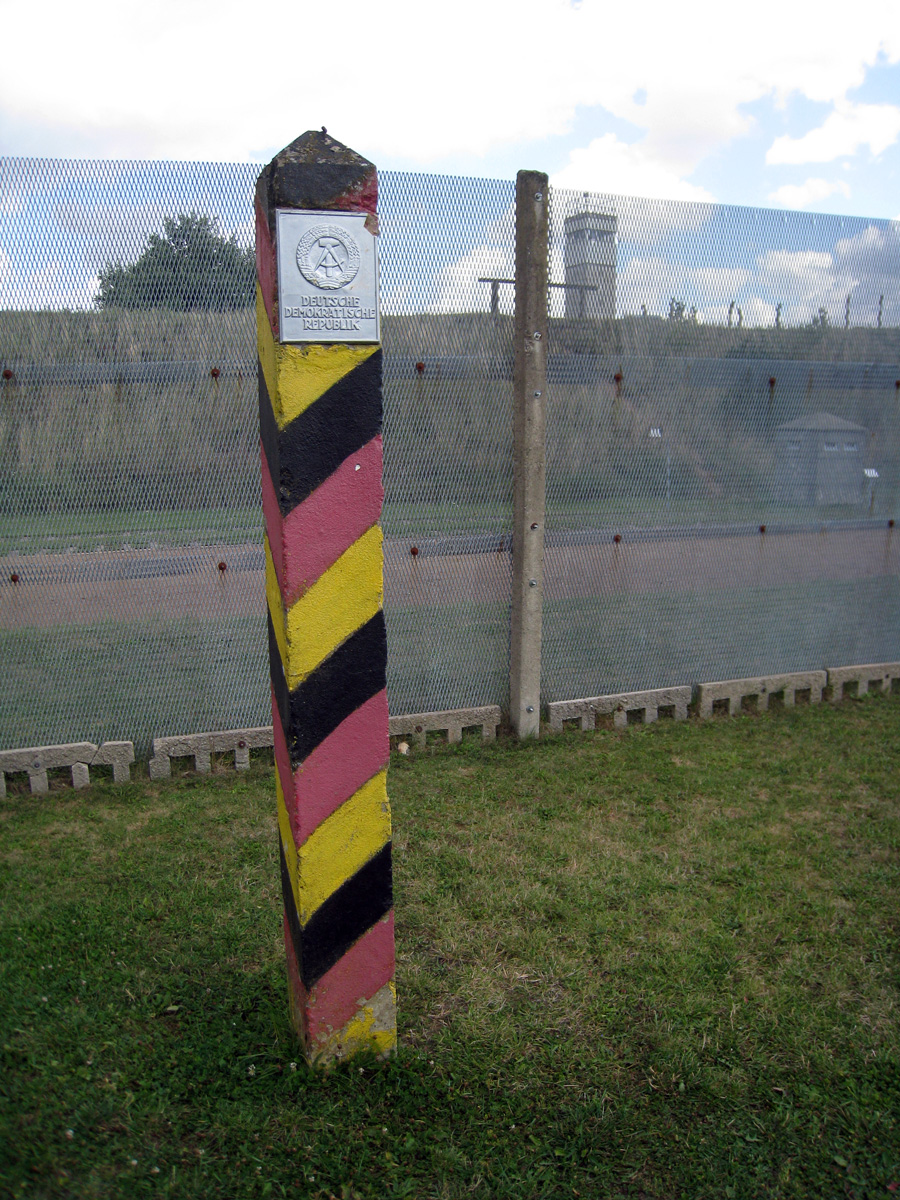
The third generation border fence, constructed from several overlapping horizontal tiers of expanded steel mesh fencing. A border marker pole is in the foreground.

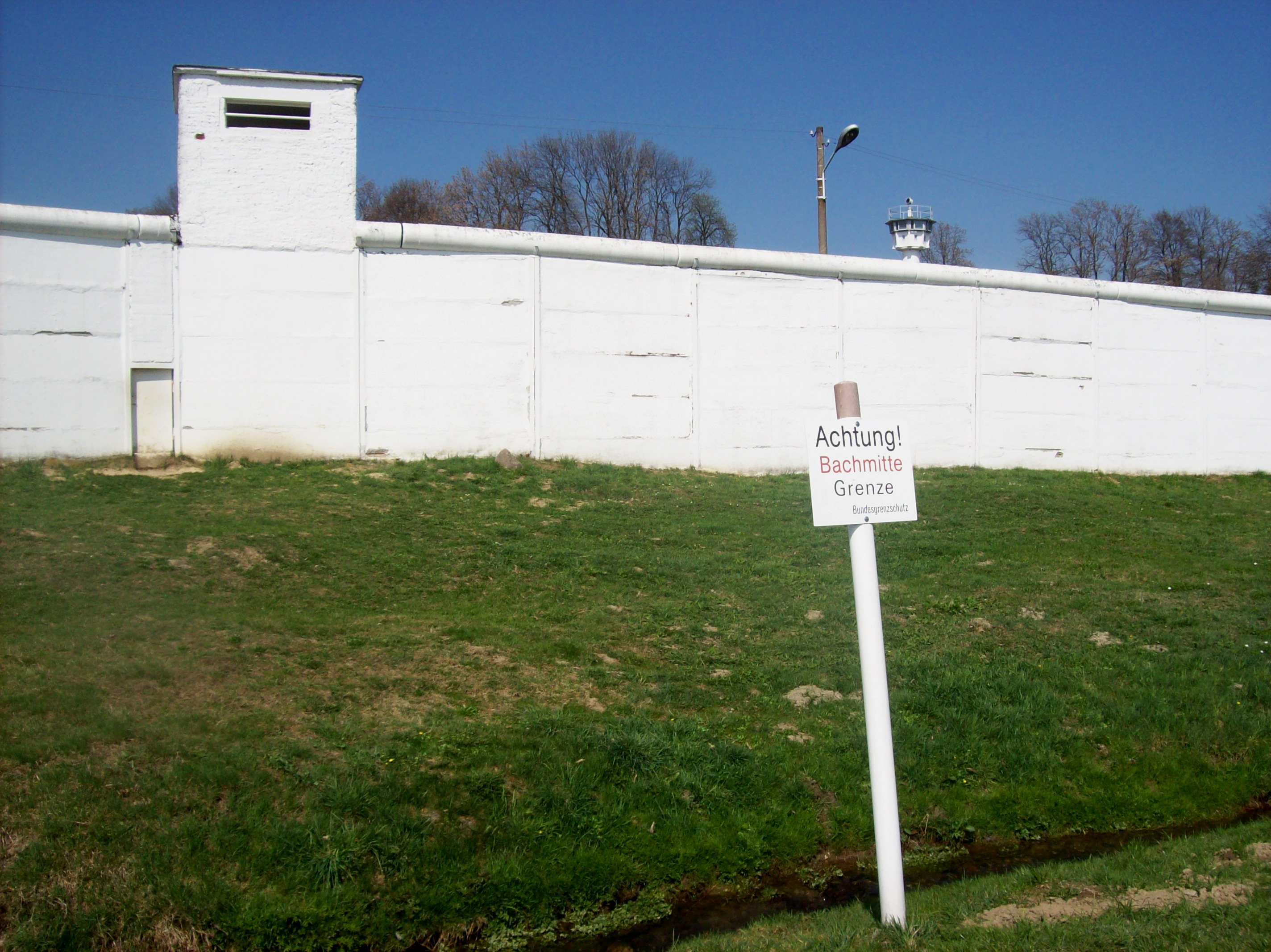
The border wall at Mödlareuth. The sign reads: "Warning! Border in middle of stream." Part of the wall has been preserved as a memorial.

A "third generation" border fence, much more solidly constructed, was installed in an ongoing programme of improvements from the late 1960s to the 1980s. The entire fence line was moved back to create an outer strip (see below) between the fence and the actual border. The barbed-wire fences were replaced with a barrier that was usually between 3.2 and 4 metres (10 and 13 ft) high. It was constructed with expanded metal mesh (Metalgitterzaun) panels. The openings in the mesh were generally too small to provide finger-holds and were very sharp. The panels could not easily be pulled down, as they overlapped, and they could not be cut through with a bolt- or wire-cutter. Nor could they be tunnelled under easily, as the bottom segment of the fences was partially buried in the ground. In a number of places, more lightly constructed fences (Lichtsperren), consisting of mesh and barbed wire, lined the border.

The fence was not continuous and could be crossed at a number of points other than the official border crossings. Gates were installed to enable border guards to patrol up to the border line and to give engineers maintenance access to the outward-facing side of the barrier. Like the fence itself, the gates were designed to be escape-proof. They were hinged from the outside but opened inwards and the pivot pins were welded to prevent their removal. They were chained and locked with heavy-duty padlocks, and a sharp saw-toothed steel strip was bolted to the top of the gates to prevent them from being climbed.

In some places, villages adjoining the border were fenced with wooden board fences (Holzlattenzaun) or concrete barrier walls (Betonsperrmauern) standing approximately 3–4 metres (9.8–13.1 ft) high. Windows in buildings adjoining the border were bricked or boarded up, and buildings deemed too close to the border were pulled down. The barrier walls stood along only a small percentage of the border – 29.1 kilometres (18.1 mi) of the total length by 1989. A notorious example was in the divided village of Mödlareuth, where the border ran along the course of a stream that bisected the village. When the border was first fortified in 1952, a wooden board fence was erected just inside East German territory. It was replaced in 1966 by a 700-metre-long (2,300 ft), 3.3-metre-high (11 ft) concrete wall built through the village on the East German side of the stream. The village was nicknamed "Little Berlin" for its resemblance to the divided city. The name was well-earned, as the wall was constructed along very similar lines to the one in Berlin. Like the Berlin Wall, its top was lined with sewer pipes or steel pipes to prevent it from being climbed and its interior perimeter was floodlit at night.

== Anti-personnel mines ==
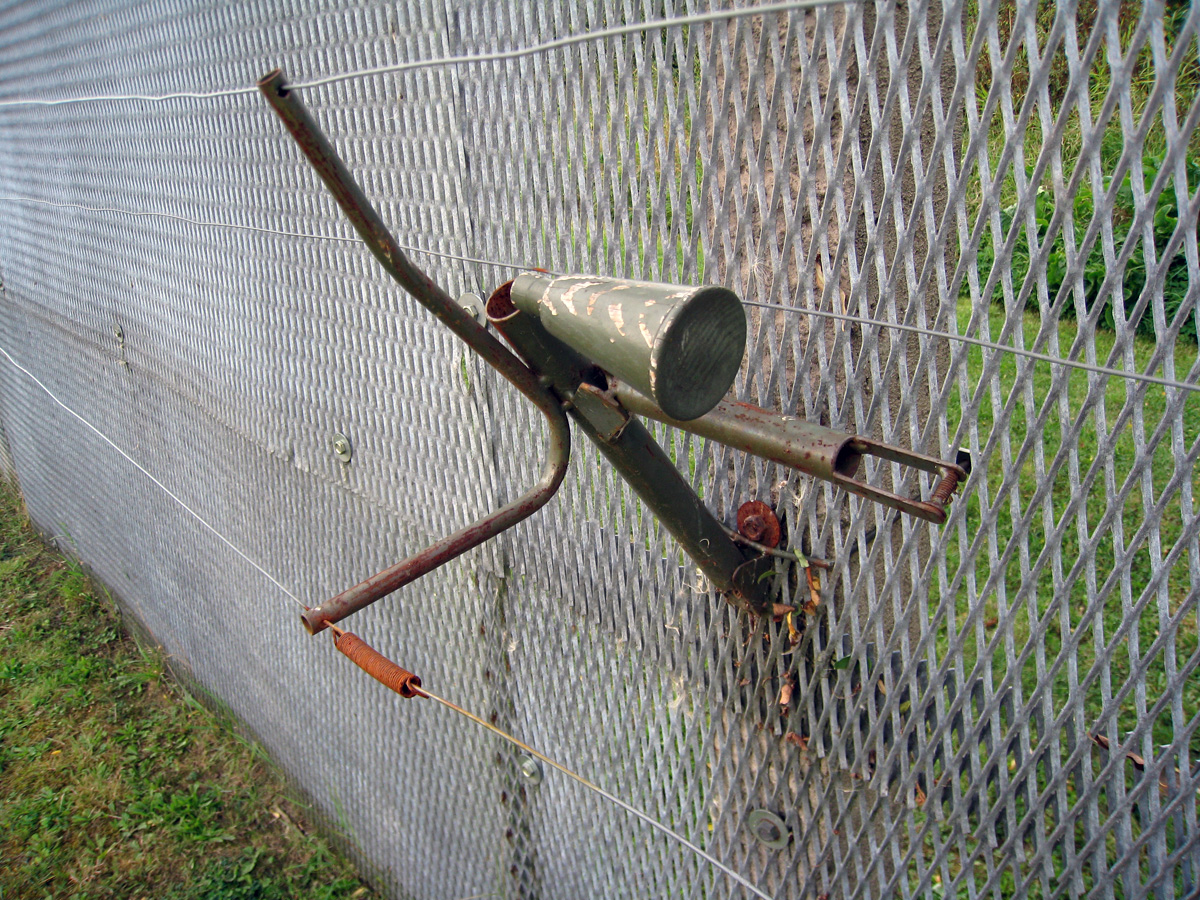
SM-70 tripwire-activated directional anti-personnel mine mounted on the border fence. The cone contained an explosive charge which fired shrapnel fragments when activated.

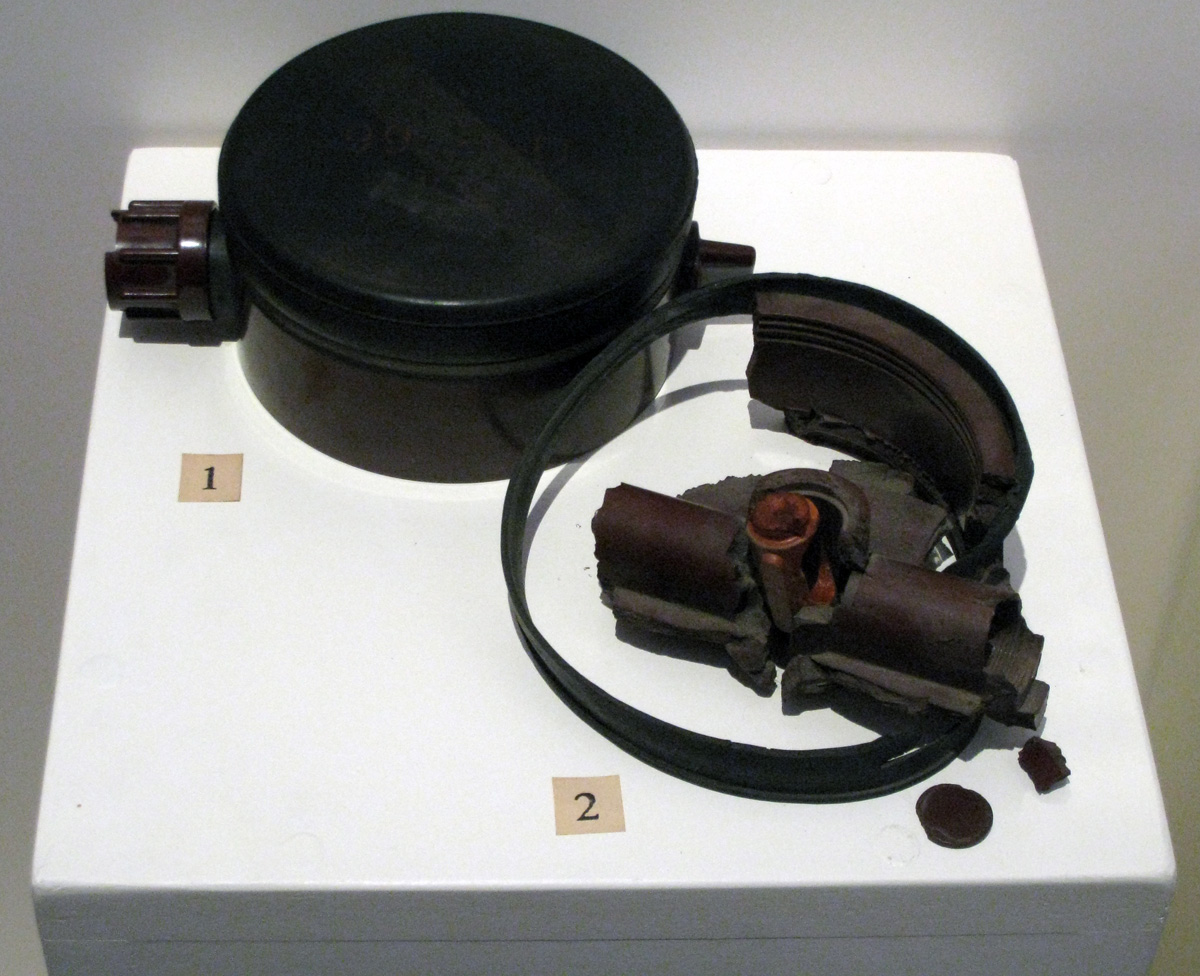
Soviet-made PMN-2 pressure-activated anti-personnel mine before (left) and after (right) detonation

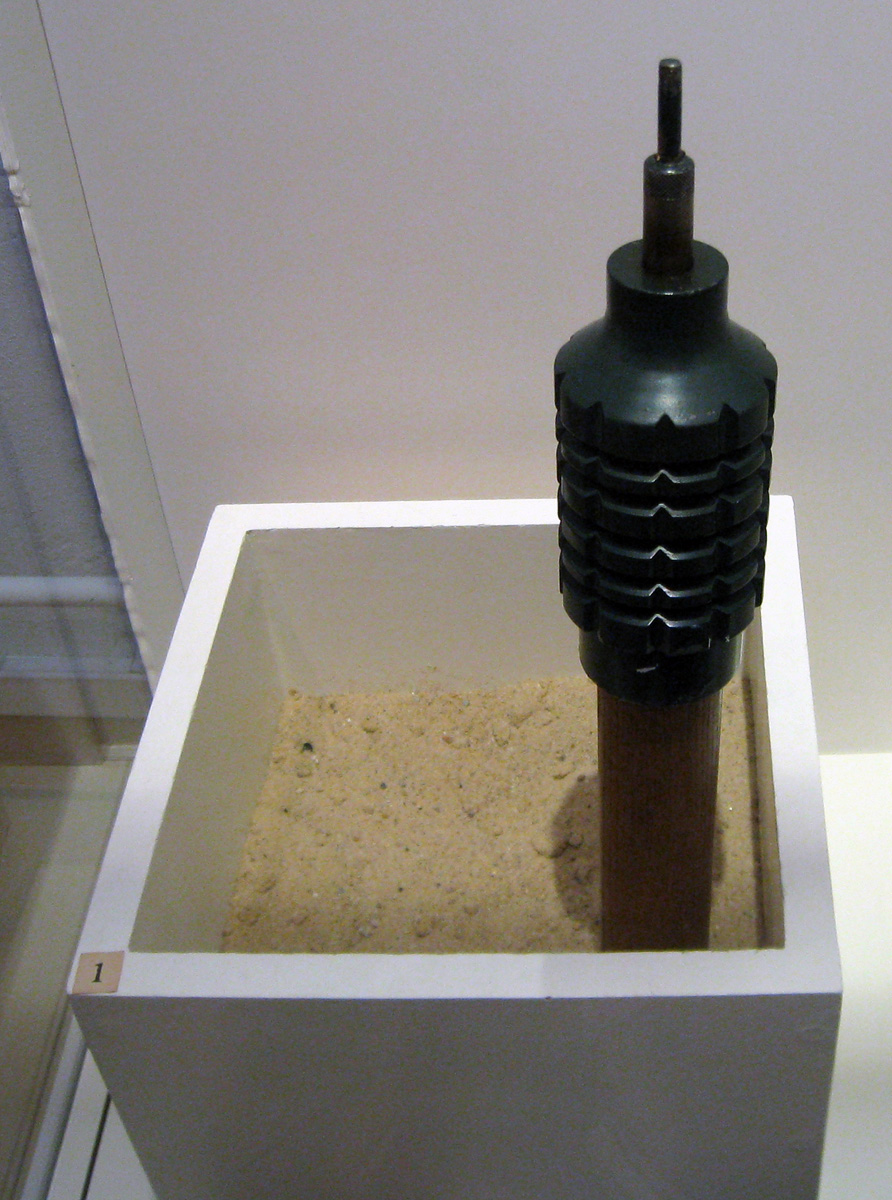
Soviet-made tripwire-activated POMZ-2 anti-personnel stake mine.

The outer border fences were lined with anti-personnel mines designed to kill or injure would-be escapees. The mining of the border began in 1966; by the 1980s, some 1.3 million mines of various Soviet-made types had been laid. The mines were usually laid in a standardised pattern of a rectangular box, 23 by 180 metres (75 by 591 ft), containing three rows of mines. The most common type was the Soviet-made PMD-6M mine. However, its wooden construction made it unreliable and prone to decay. The PMD-6Ms were later replaced by more durable plastic mines of the PMN-2, PMP-71 and PPM-2 types. Most of the mines were pressure-activated, requiring someone to step on one to detonate it, with the exception of the tripwire-activated POMZ-2 stake mine. The minefields were not marked on the East German side, though Achtung! Minen! signs were often posted by the West Germans on their side. The mines were a hazard to civilians on both sides of the border; they were frequently set off by animals such as deer and could be washed out of position by rain or floods. It was not unknown for mines to travel hundreds of metres into fields and streams on either side of the border.

In 1970, the East Germans began to introduce the SM-70 (Splittermine-70) directional anti-personnel mine, mounted on the border fence itself. Some 60,000 SM-70s were eventually installed. It was given various descriptions in the West such as "spring gun" or "self-firing device", though to the East Germans, it was known as the "automated firing device" (Selbstschußapparat). The device consisted of a horizontally oriented cone filled with 110 grams (3.9 oz) of TNT explosive into which was embedded approximately 80 small sharp-edged steel cubes. It was fitted to the inward-facing side of the border fence at intervals of around 10 metres (33 ft). The device was triggered if the tripwire connected to the firing mechanism was pulled or cut. It was potentially lethal to a maximum range of around 120 metres (390 ft), though its effective lethal range was 25 metres (82 ft). On one occasion, when a deer fell victim to an SM-70, an observer noted that "an approximately 5 meter [20'] area appeared as if it had been worked over by a rake." By 1976, SM-70s had been installed along 248 km (155 miles) of the border and conventional minefields lined another 491 km (305 miles). The mines were eventually removed by the end of 1984 in the face of international condemnation of the East German government.

== Outer strip ==
Until the late 1960s, the border fortifications were constructed almost up to the actual border line. The later "modern frontier", by contrast, incorporated a wide strip of cleared land on the western side in front of the border fence. The outer strip ranged in width from 20 metres (66 ft) to as much as 2 kilometres (1.2 mi). It gave the border guards a clear field of fire to target escapees who had made it over the fence and provided a buffer zone where engineers could work on maintaining the outward face of the border defences. Access to the outer strip was very tightly controlled to ensure that the guards themselves would not be tempted to escape. Although often described by Western sources as a "no-man's land", it was in fact wholly East German territory; trespassers could be arrested or shot.

== Border line ==
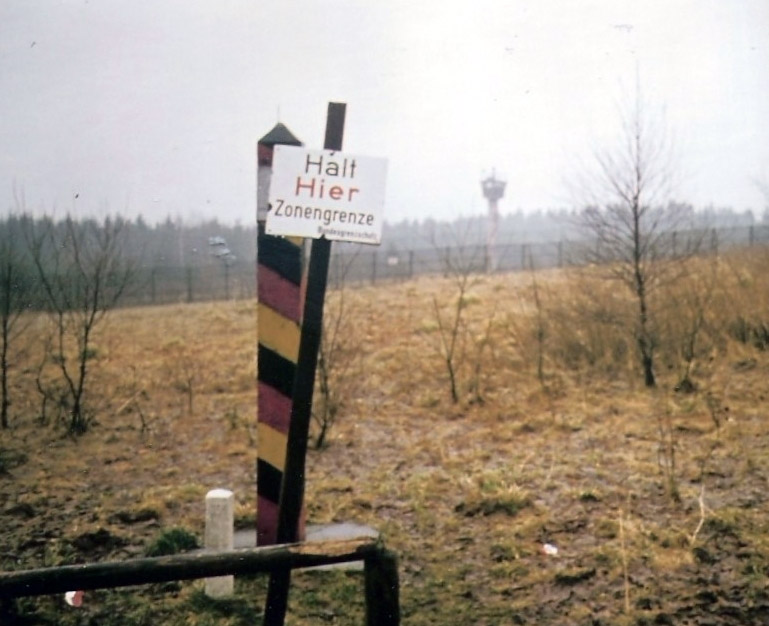
The actual border: a West German boundary sign, an East German boundary marker and the border fence beyond.

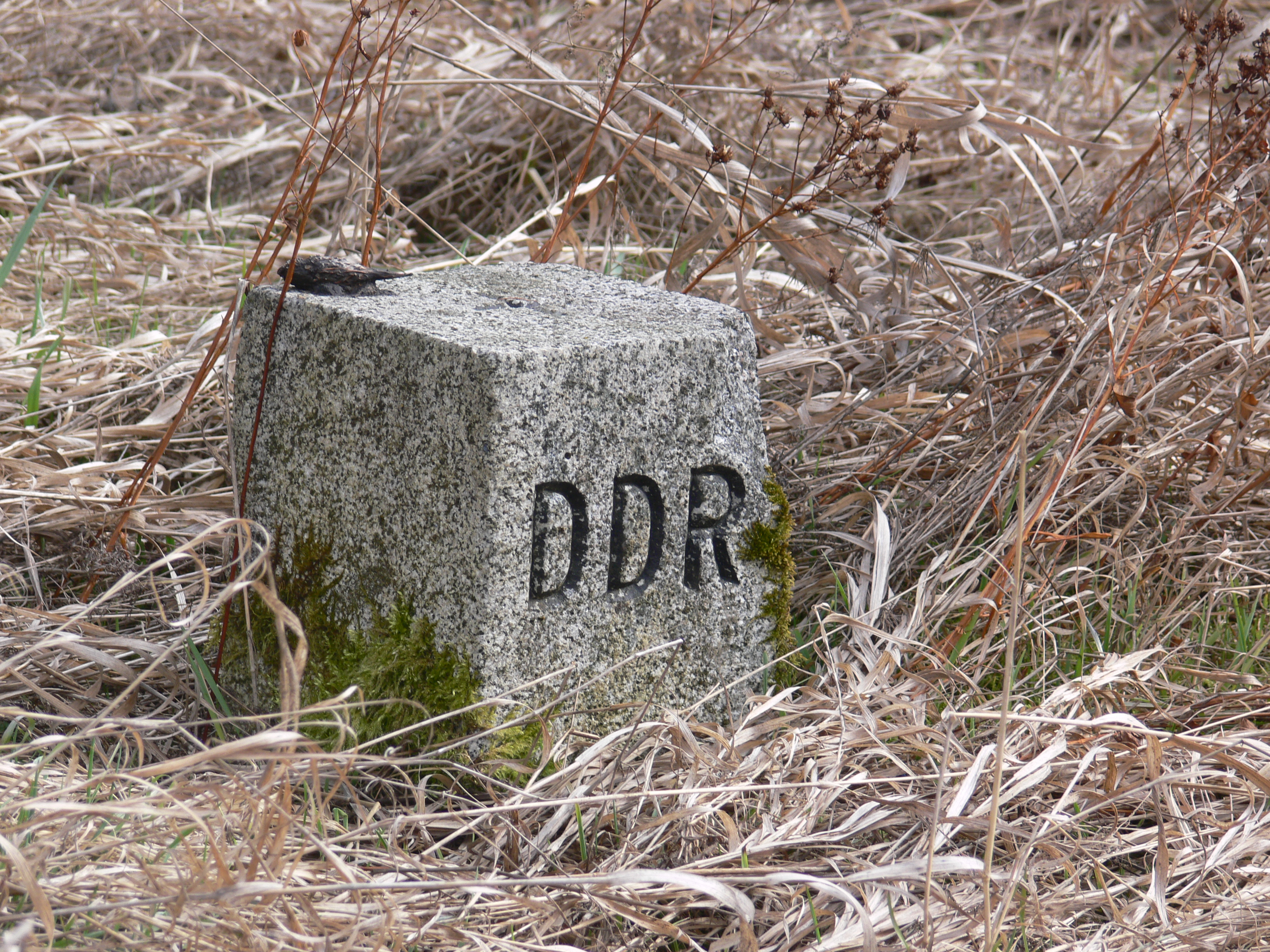
An East German border boundary stone with the letters "DDR" carved on the eastern-facing edge

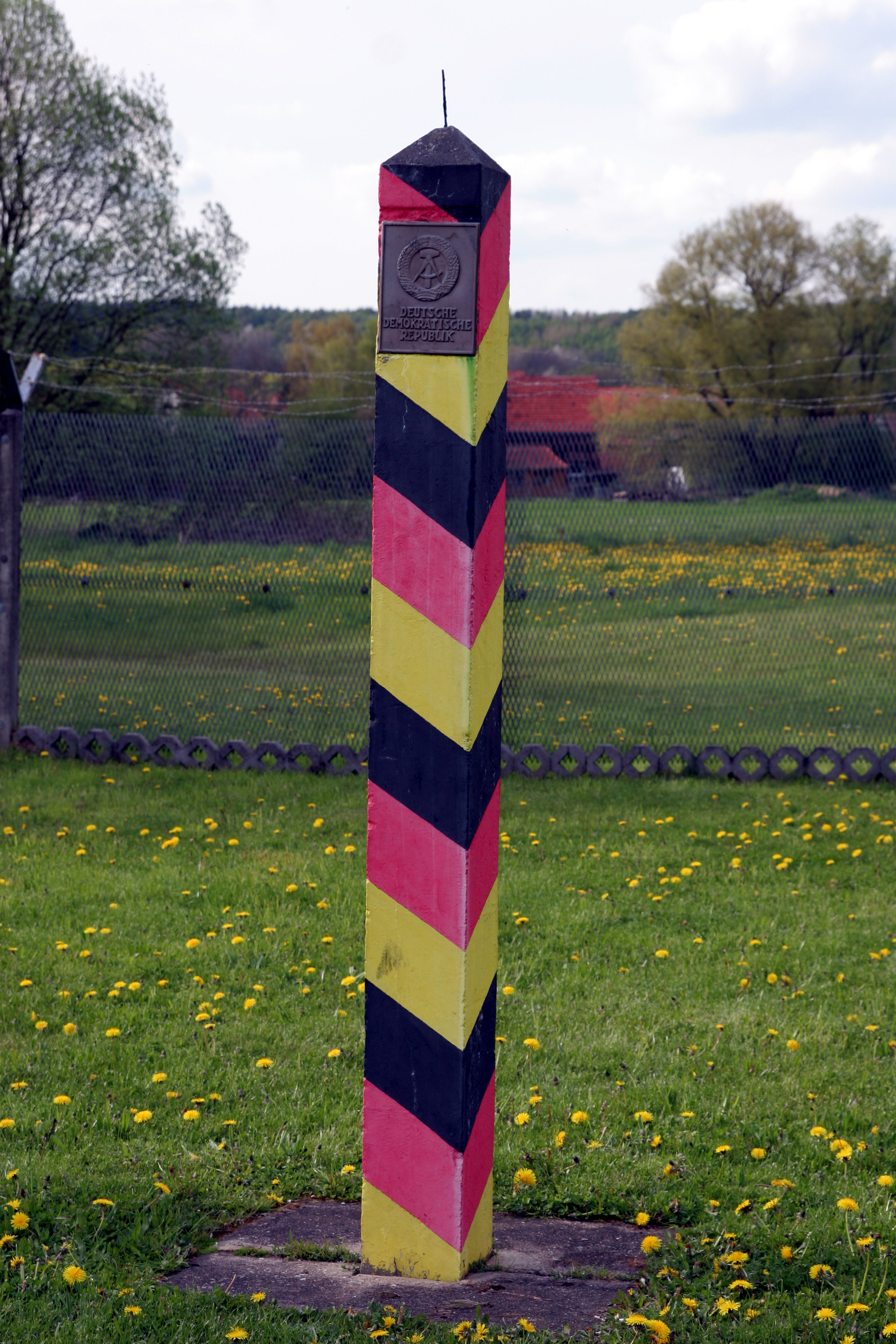
The distinctive "barber pole" type of border marker

The actual border line between West and East Germany was located on the far side of the outer strip. It was marked by granite border stones (Grenzsteine), 20 centimetres (7.9 in) square with a + carved on the top and the letters "DDR" on the east-facing edge. In August 1967, East Germany erected 2,622 distinctive border markers or "barber's poles" (Grenzsäule or Grenzpfähle), each located about 500 feet (150 m) apart. They were made of concrete and painted with the black, red and gold colours of the German flag. Some can still be seen in situ today. A metal East German coat of arms, the Staatsemblem, was fixed to the side of the column that faced West Germany. The column terminated in a metal spike to stop birds using the border markers as a perch and thereby prevent them from defecating on the coat of arms.

On the West German side there were no barriers of any kind, nor even any patrol roads in most areas. Warning signs (Grenzschilder) with messages such as Achtung! Zonengrenze! ("Danger! Zonal border!") or Halt! Hier Zonengrenze ("Stop! The zonal border is here") notified visitors of the presence of the border. Signs in English and German provided notifications of the distance to the border to discourage accidental crossings. Foreign military personnel were restricted from approaching the border to avoid clashes or other unwanted incidents. No such restriction applied to Western civilians, who were free to go up to the border line. There were no physical obstacles to stop them actually crossing it, and there were incidents of West Germans crossing the border to steal East German border markers as souvenirs (at considerable risk, since the East German border guards sought to prevent such "provocations").

== See also ==
- Grepo
- Crossing the inner German border
- Development of the inner German border
- Border guards of the inner German border
- Escape attempts and victims of the inner German border
- Fall of the inner German border
