= Border guards of the inner German border =

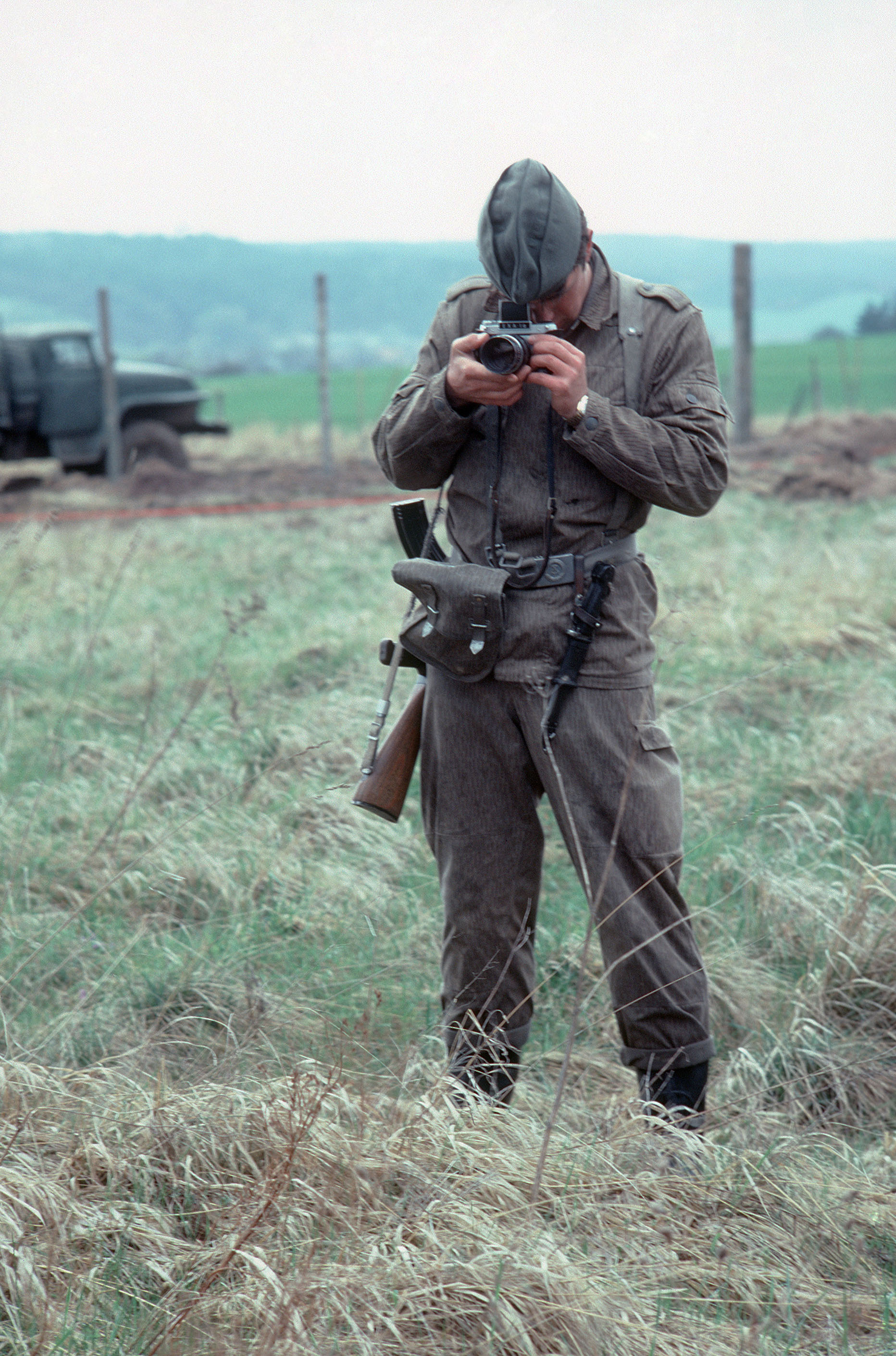
Grenzaufklärungszug (Border Reconnaissance) soldier taking photographs across the border

The border guards of the inner German border comprised tens of thousands of military, paramilitary and civilian personnel from both East and West Germany, as well as from the United Kingdom, the United States and initially the Soviet Union.

== East Germany ==
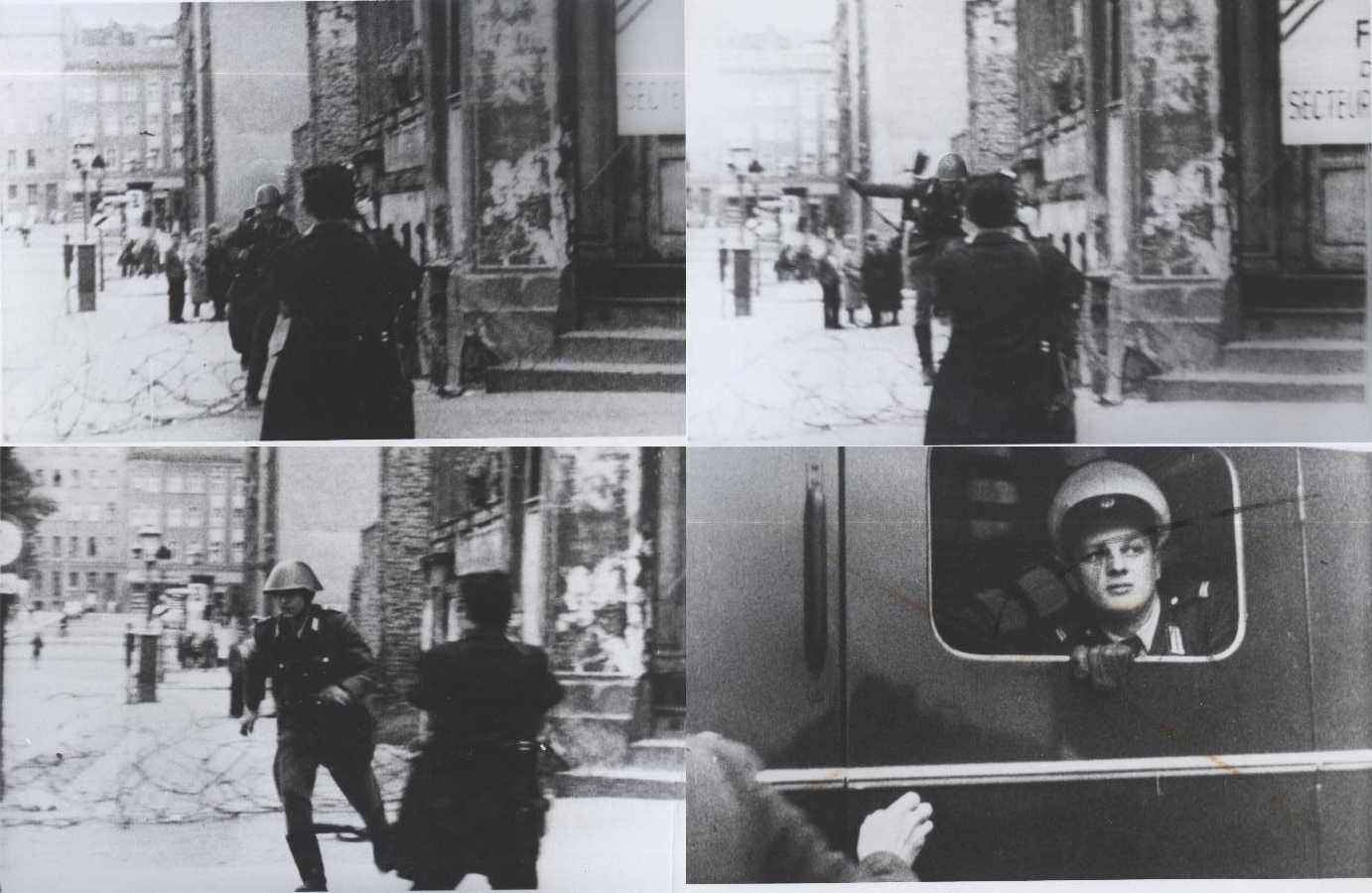
East German border guard Konrad Schumann fleeing East Germany, 1961.

The East German side of the border was guarded initially by the Border Troops (Pogranichnyie Voiska) of the Soviet NKVD (later the KGB). In 1946, the Soviets established a locally recruited paramilitary force, the German Border Police (Deutsche Grenzpolizei or DGP), under the administration of the Interior Ministry for Security of the State Frontier (Innenministerium zum Schutz der Staatsgrenze). Soviet troops and the DGP shared responsibility for patrolling the border and crossing points until 1955/56, when the Soviets handed over control to the East Germans.

The DGP became increasingly militarised as the East German government decided that protecting the border was a military task. Although it was notionally a police force, it was equipped with heavy weapons, including tanks and self-propelled artillery. In 1961 the DGP was converted into a military force within the National People's Army (Nationale Volksarmee, NVA). The newly renamed Border Troops of the GDR (Grenztruppen, commonly nicknamed the "Grenzer") came under the NVA's Border Command or Grenzkommando. They were responsible for securing and defending the borders with West Germany, Czechoslovakia, Poland, the Baltic Sea and West Berlin. At their peak, the Grenztruppen had up to 50,000 personnel.

Around half of the Grenztruppen were conscripts, a lower proportion than in other branches of the East German armed forces. Their political reliability was under especially close scrutiny due to the sensitive nature of their role. They were subjected to intensive ideological indoctrination, which made up as much as 50 per cent of their training time. They were not allowed to serve in areas near their homes. Some categories of individuals were not allowed to serve in the Grenztruppen at all; for instance, if they had close relatives in West Germany, a record of dissent or dissenting family members, or were actively religious. Even if they were accepted for service, trainee border guards who were suspected of political unreliability were weeded out at an early stage. As one later recalled: "At the officers' training school there are always 10 per cent whose loyalty is suspect who are never sent to the border."

The ultimate role of the Grenztruppen was to prevent border escapes by any means necessary, including by shooting escapees. Their marksmanship was expected to be substantially better than that of regular NVA troops; they were required to be able to hit two moving targets at 200 metres (660 ft) with only four shots, by day or night. Failure to shoot was itself a punishable offence, resulting in severe consequences for a soldier and his family.

The East German regime's distrust of its own citizens extended to its border guards, who were in a better position to defect than almost anyone else in the country. Many did in fact flee across the border; between 1961 and 1989, around 7,000 border guards tried to escape. 2,500 succeeded but 5,500 were caught and imprisoned for up to five years. To prevent such defections, the Stasi secret police kept a close watch on the border guards with agents and informers. A special Stasi unit worked covertly within the Grenztruppen, posing as regular border guards, between 1968 and 1985. The Stasi also maintained a pervasive network of informers within the ranks of the Grenztruppen. One in ten officers and one in thirty enlisted men were said to have been "liaison agents", the euphemism for an informer. The Stasi regularly interviewed and maintained files on every border guard. Stasi operatives were directly responsible for some aspects of border security; passport control stations were entirely manned by Stasi officers wearing Grenztruppen uniforms.

As a further measure to prevent escapes, the patrol patterns of the Grenztruppen were carefully arranged to reduce any chance of a border guard defecting. Patrols, watchtowers and observation posts were always manned by two or three soldiers at a time. They were not allowed to go out of each other's sight in any circumstances. When changing the guard in watchtowers, they were under orders to enter and exit the buildings in such a way that there were never fewer than two people on the ground. Duty rosters were organised to prevent friends and roommates being assigned to the same patrols. The pairings were switched (though not randomly) to ensure that the same people did not repeatedly carry out duty together. Individual border guards did not know until the start of their shift with whom they would be working that day. If a guard attempted to escape, his colleagues were under instructions to shoot him without hesitation or prior warning.

Much of the work of the border guards focused on maintaining and scrutinising the border defences. This included carrying out repair work, looking for evidence of escape attempts, examining the area for signs of suspicious activities and so on. The patrol times and routes were deliberately varied to ensure that there was no predictability, ensuring that a patrol could potentially appear at any time from either direction. Guards posted in watchtowers played an important role in monitoring the border, though shortages of personnel meant that the watchtowers were not continuously manned. During the final years of the East German state, the lack of manpower was so severe that cardboard cut-outs of guards were placed in towers to present the illusion that they were occupied.

The Grenztruppen also had the task of gathering intelligence on West German and NATO activities across the border line. This task was performed primarily by the Grenzaufklärungszug (GAK), an elite reconnaissance force within the Grenztruppen. These became a familiar sight for Western observers of the border as the GAK troopers, uniquely, were tasked with patrolling the western side of the border fence – i.e. in the outer strip, adjoining the geographical border between the two German states. Not surprisingly, given that they could defect with only a few footsteps in the right direction, the GAKs were drawn from the most politically reliable echelons of the Grenztruppen. They worked closely with the Stasi and were often seen photographing targets across the border. They also guarded work detachments carrying out maintenance work on the western side of the fence. The workers would be covered by machine guns to discourage them from attempting to escape.

To maintain what the East German state called Ordnung und Sicherheit ("order and security") along the border, local civilians were co-opted to assist the border guards and police. A decree of 5 June 1958 spoke of encouraging "the working population in the border districts of the GDR [to express] the desire to help by volunteering to guarantee the inviolability of the border." Civilians living in villages along the border were recruited into the "Border Helpers" (Grenzhelfer) and "People's Police Helpers" (Volkspolizeihelfer). They were tasked with patrolling the strip behind the border defences, assisting at control checkpoints and reporting any unusual activities or strangers in their area. In one border community, Kella in Thuringia, the mayor boasted in a 1967 speech that nearly two-thirds of arrests on the border that year had been made by local civilians. The locals were, however, kept away from the border strip itself. The border guards were usually recruited from far-away regions of East Germany to ensure that people living near the border would not become familiar with its workings. Even children were brought into the fold. A "Young Friends of the Border Guards" organisation was established for children living in the border region, modelled on a similar Soviet organisation. The original Soviet version fostered a cult of the border guards, promoting slogans such as "The frontier runs through people's hearts."

== West Germany ==
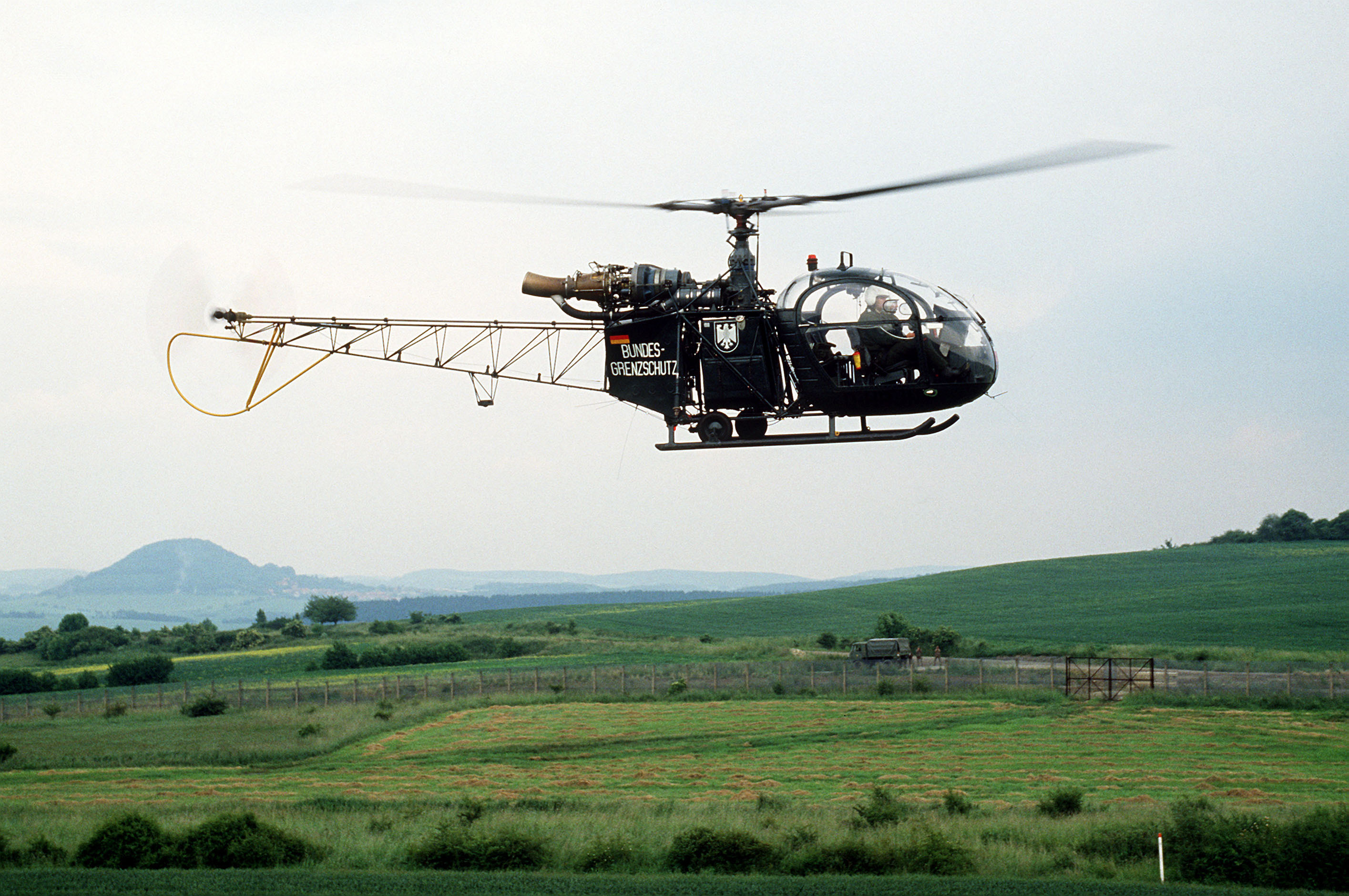
A Bundesgrenzschutz Alouette II helicopter patrolling the West German side of the inner German border, 1985.

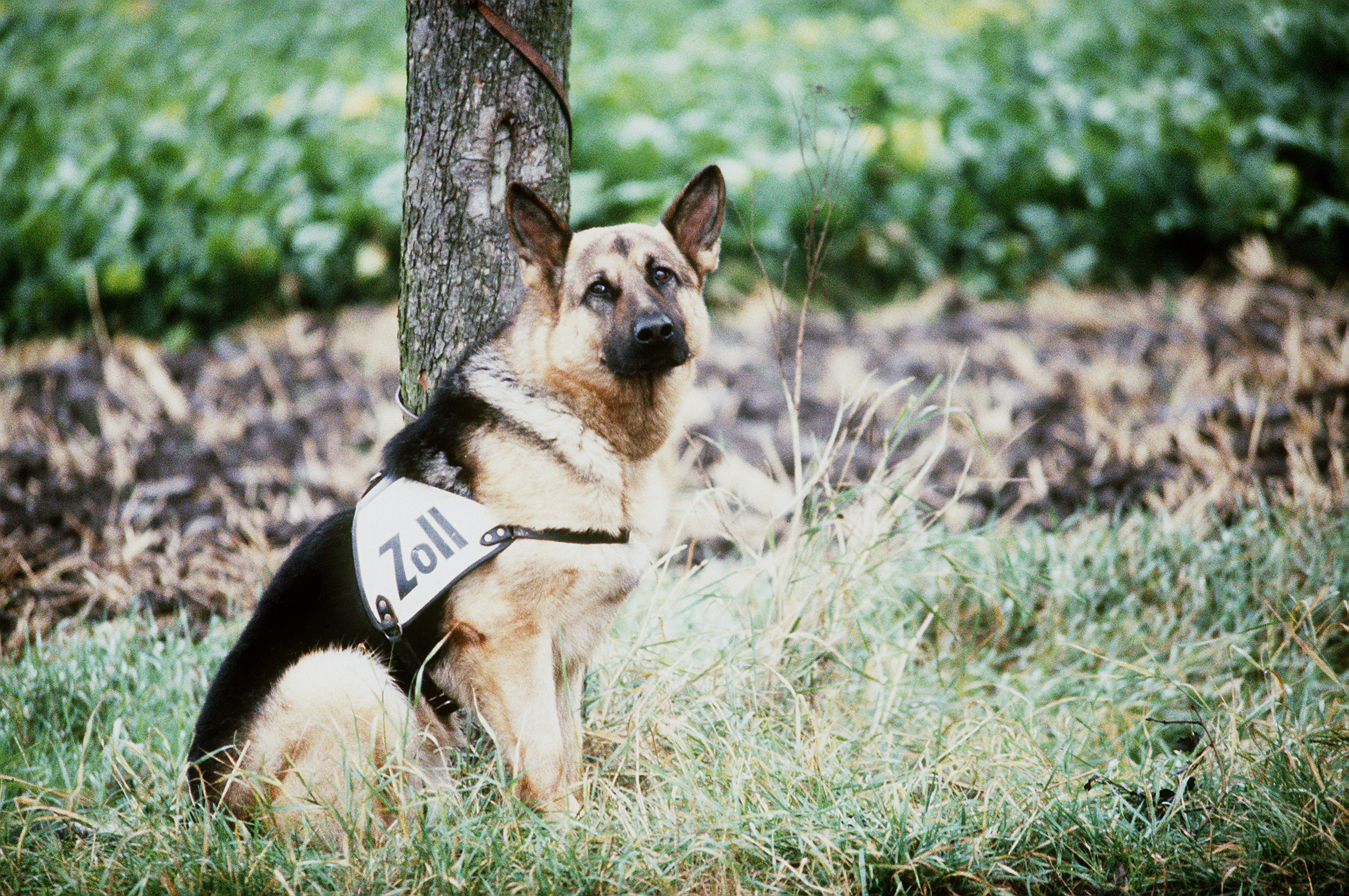
A West German customs dog (Zollhund) on the inner German border in 1984.

A number of West German state organisations were responsible for policing the western side of the border. These included the Bundesgrenzschutz (BGS, Federal Border Protection), the Bayerische Grenzpolizei (Bavarian Border Police) and the Bundeszollverwaltung (Federal Customs Administration). In addition, the British Army, the British Frontier Service, the United States Constabulary, and the United States Army carried out patrols and provided backup in their respective sectors of the border. West German troops were not allowed to approach within one kilometre (1000 yards) of the border individually or within five kilometres (3 miles) in formation without being accompanied by BGS personnel.

The BGS – which today forms part of the Bundespolizei – was responsible for policing Germany's frontiers. It was initially a paramilitary force of 10,000, established in 1951, which was responsible for policing a zone 30 kilometres (19 mi) deep along the border. It eventually became the basis for the present national semi-militarised police force. Its numbers were later expanded to 20,000 men, a mixture of conscripts, drafted for the mandatory border guard service and volunteers equipped with armoured cars, anti-tank guns, helicopters, trucks and jeeps. Although it was not intended to be able to repel a full-scale invasion, the BGS was tasked with dealing with small-scale threats to the security of West Germany's borders, including the international borders as well as the inner German border. It had limited police powers within its zone of operations to enable it to deal with threats to the peace of the border. The BGS had a reputation for assertiveness which made it especially unpopular with the East Germans, who routinely criticised it as a reincarnation of Hitler's SS. It also sustained a long-running feud with the Bundeszollverwaltung over which agency should have the lead responsibility for the inner German border.

Although it was nominally a customs service, the Bundeszollverwaltung (BZV) was responsible for policing much of the inner German border. Its original duties focused on stopping smuggling across the border, though this task virtually ceased after the border was fortified in 1952. The BZV continued to man the few remaining border crossings but its duties now evolved into the policing of the border zone to a depth of about 10 kilometres (6.2 mi). Unlike the BGS, which was based in barracks located further back from the border, BZV personnel lived with their families in communities along the border. They carried out regular policing tasks with the power to arrest and search suspects in their area of operations (with the exception of the section of border in Bavaria). They regularly patrolled the border line – including the river border along the Elbe, where they maintained a fleet of patrol boats – in two-man patrols or with the iconic Zollhunde, trained customs dogs wearing a Zoll ("Customs") strap. The BZV was, in effect, West Germany's eyes and ears on the border.

The Bayerische Grenzpolizei (BGP) were a product of Bavaria's semi-detached relationship with the rest of West Germany. The Bavarian government argued that the 1949 Basic Law vested police powers in the hands of the Länder and not the federal government, and thus that the BZV had no business carrying out police duties on Bavarian soil. It consequently raised its own border police force, the BGP, to carry out policing duties along the 390 kilometres (240 mi) length of the inner German border in Bavaria. By the late 1960s, the BGP had 600 men patrolling its sector of the border, alongside the BZV, BGS and U.S. Army – effectively duplicating the duties of the BZV. Not surprisingly, this led to turf wars between the two agencies.

== Western allies ==
=== United Kingdom ===
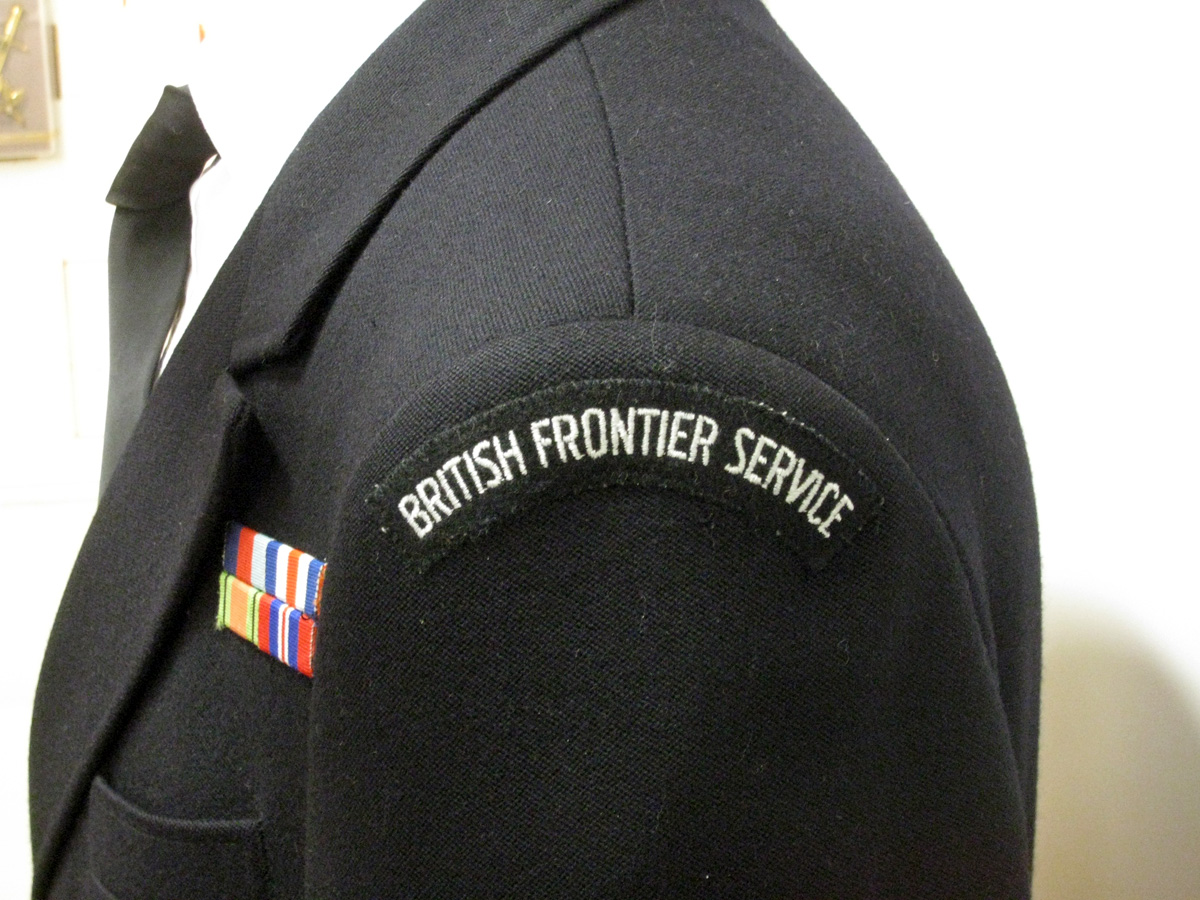
Side view of the shoulder of a dark-coloured uniform with the words "British Frontier Service" visible on a shoulder patch and a row of medal ribbons visible on the front left breast above a pocket.

The British Army conducted only symbolic patrols along its sector of the inner German border and gradually reduced the tempo of its border operations as the Cold War progressed. By the 1970s it was carrying out only one patrol a month, only rarely using helicopters or ground surveillance radar and erecting no permanent observation posts. The British border zone was divided into two sectors. The first stretched from Lübeck to Lauenburg on the Elbe and the second from Lauenburg to the border with the U.S. Zone – a total distance of about 650 kilometres (400 mi). Although patrols were stepped up in the 1980s, they were carried out primarily for training purposes. Soldiers were issued weapons but not ammunition. Unlike the Americans, the British did not assign specific units to border duty but rotated the task between the divisions of the British Army of the Rhine.

The border was also patrolled in the British sector by the British Frontier Service (BFS), the smallest of the Western border surveillance organisations. The BFS had been established (as the Frontier Control Service) in 1946 to take over control of border crossing points from the British Army. Its personnel manned frontier control posts along all of the international and interzonal borders of the British sector, including the Danish and Dutch borders as well as the inner German border. The German customs service was re-established under BFS supervision and manned crossing points on the borders of the British zone of occupation along with BFS personnel. When German sovereignty was re-established in 1955, customs responsibilities were handed over to the Germans. A heavily reduced BFS remained in operation to serve as a liaison between British military and political interests and the German agencies on the border. One curiosity of the BFS was that despite being entirely land-based, its founding Director was a Royal Navy captain. He instituted the highly distinctive uniform of the BFS, designed in a quasi-naval style with silver rank badges. The BFS was finally disbanded in 1990 following Germany's reunification.

=== United States ===
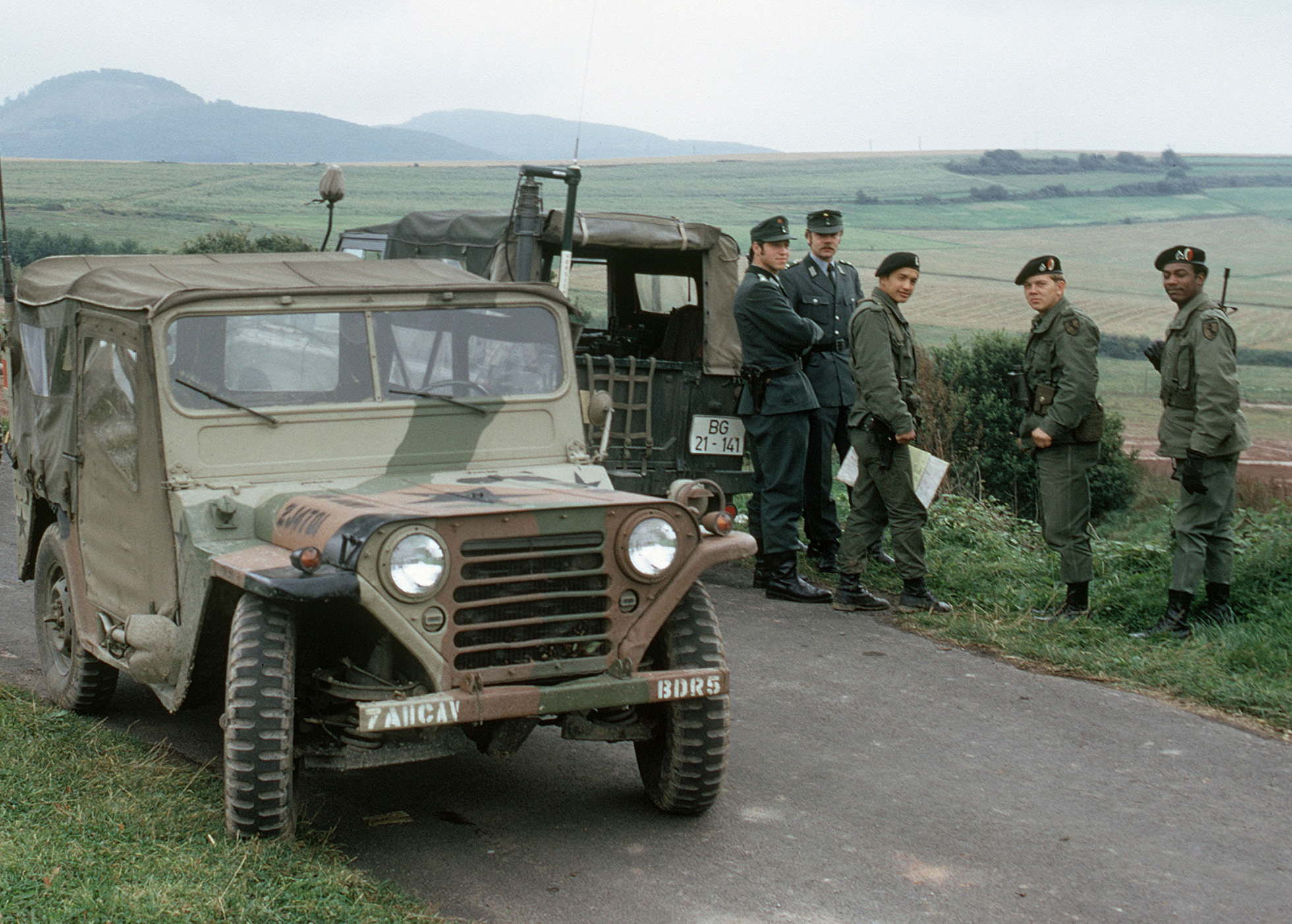
M151 jeep, and two West German Bundesgrenzschutz officers, 1979.

The United States Army maintained a substantial and continuous military presence at the inner German border throughout the entire period from 1945 to after the end of the Cold War. Regular American soldiers manned the border from the end of the war until they were replaced in 1946 by the United States Constabulary, a lightly armed constabulary force responsible for border security. It was disbanded in 1952 after policing duties were transferred to the German authorities. In its place, two dedicated armoured cavalry regiments were assigned to provide a permanent border defence. The 2nd Armored Cavalry Regiment based at Nuremberg and the 14th Armored Cavalry Regiment based at Fulda– later replaced by the 11th Armored Cavalry Regiment – were tasked with monitoring the border using observation posts, ground and air patrols, countering border intrusions and gathering intelligence on Warsaw Pact activities. Unlike their East German counterparts, U.S. soldiers did not stay for more than 30 days on the border, though they carried out regular patrols around the clock using foot and helicopter patrols. They also used a variety of technical measures such as ground surveillance radars to monitor Warsaw Pact troop movements across the border. A rapid reaction force was on constant duty further behind the border to provide backup in an emergency. The American presence on the border provoked political controversy in Germany. During the 1960s the state of Hesse refused to grant U.S. forces land rights to its observation points or allow them to install paved access roads, electricity or telephone lines. It took the view that since there was no legally recognised border, there was no legal reason for their military observation posts to be built along it. By the 1980s the American border presence had become the target of peace activists, who in 1984 blockaded the U.S. Observation Post Alpha with a human chain. The U.S. withdrew from the inner German border in 1991.

== Cross-border contacts ==
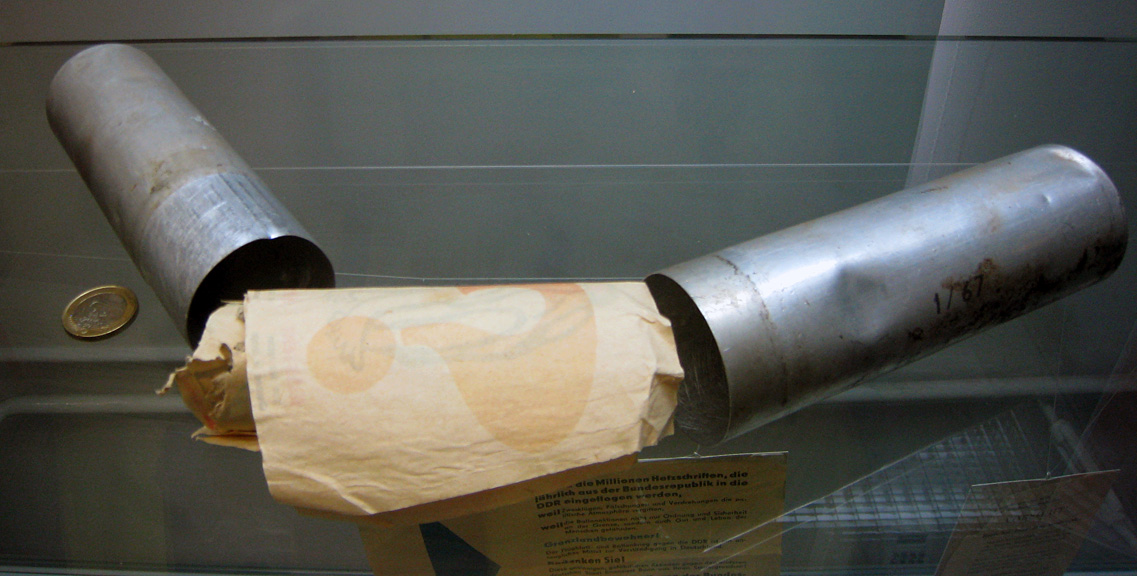
East German propaganda leaflets in a canister which was fired across the inner German border attached to a rocket.

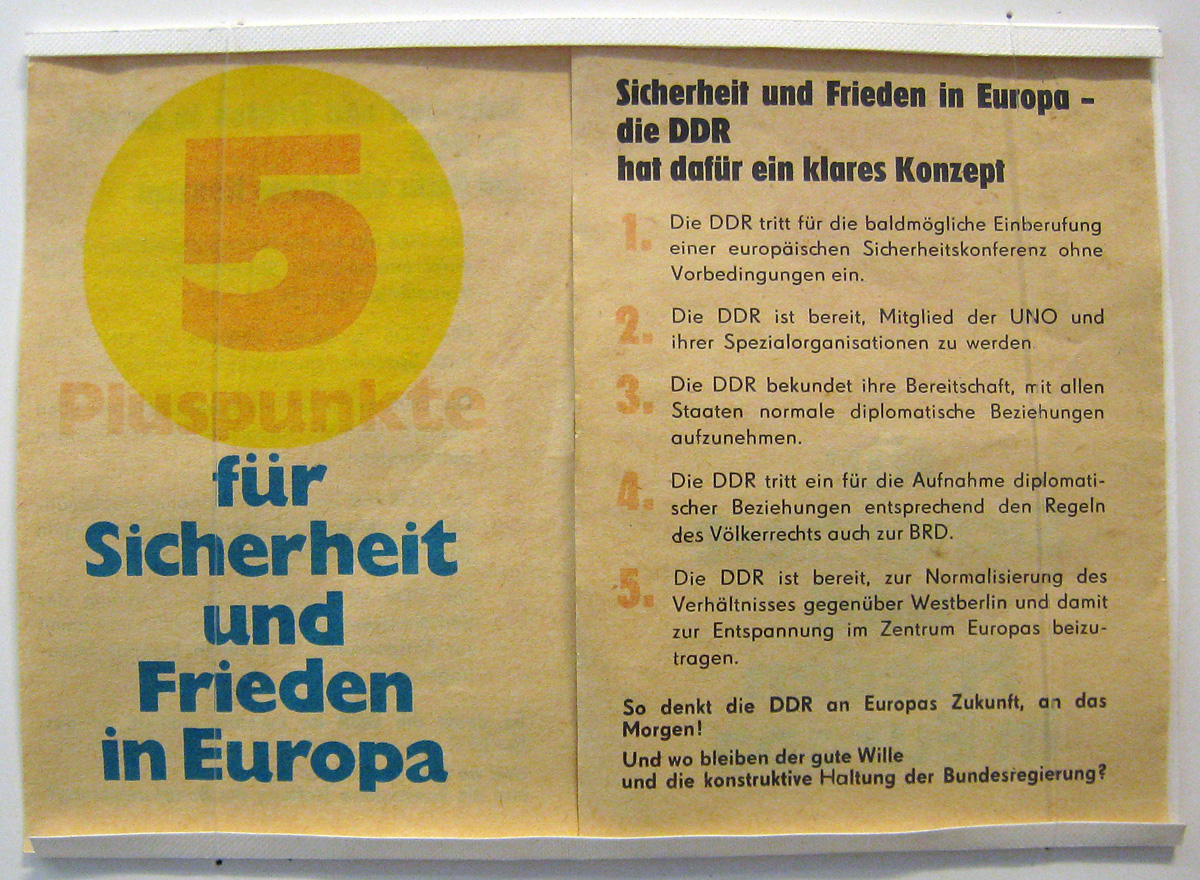
Example of an East German propaganda leaflet, promoting East Germany's diplomatic policies.

The relationship between the East and West German border guards and officials was frosty. As a Bayerische Grenzpolizei report of 1968 noted, "the conduct of the Soviet zone [i.e. East German] border troops continued unfriendly and uncooperative. Officers and officials only sought contact to obtain information about refugees or to influence the border population with their propaganda." There was very little official face-to-face interaction between the two sides on the ground, as the East German border guards were under orders not to speak to Westerners. Klaus Grünzner, a former West German border guard, later recalled: "I served ... for eight years and the East German police never said a single word to us, except in 1974 during the World Cup, when East Germany beat us. One of the guards shouted at us: 'Sparwasser [a GDR striker] really socked it to you!'" After the initiation of détente between East and West Germany in the 1970s, the two sides established procedures for maintaining formal contacts through fourteen direct telephone connections or Grenzinformationspunkt (GIP, "border information point"). They were used to resolve local problems affecting the border, such as floods, forest fires or stray animals.

For many years, the two sides waged a propaganda battle across the border, erecting signs with slogans promoting their respective ideologies. Both sides used balloons, rockets and mortars to fire propaganda leaflets into the other's territory with the aim of undermining the other side's morale and sowing doubts about their government's policies. The West German government and political parties of both left and right, especially the Social Democrats and Christian Democrats, participated in the campaign.

West German leaflets sought to undermine the willingness of East German border guards to shoot at refugees attempting to cross the border. Some leaflets depicted dead and dying refugees alongside captions such as "The world knows that the overwhelming majority of the People's Army soldiers are decent young men who would not dream of committing murder." Other leaflets sought to encourage desertions by highlighting the material benefits enjoyed by defectors to the West. According to NVA officers who defected across the border, the West German leaflets were quite effective in reaching their target audience. Border troops were said to be avid readers, despite risking severe punishment if they were caught even picking up propaganda leaflets. Reasons advanced for taking the risk included trying to find out the true facts, affirming solidarity with West Germany, the thrill of doing something forbidden, demonstrating secret opposition to the regime, and simple curiosity.

East German leaflets and slogans played on Westerners' desire for peace. A common theme was the allegation that the Bonn government was threatening European peace and security by its supposed "revanchist" aim of restoring Germany's 1937 borders. West Germany's moral values were also criticised; one leaflet accused the government of corrupting its people with "pictures of playgirls and naked female legs". West Germany's membership of NATO was a frequent target. NATO exercises in Germany were denounced as "warmongering" and the stationing of nuclear weapons on West German soil was condemned. Bonn's claimed continuity with the former Nazi regime was also a theme of East German propaganda, as was the emergence of the far-right National Democratic Party. Some leaflets were bellicose, warning of the consequences of a Western attack: "The manoeuvre Oktobersturm [a Warsaw Pact military exercise in 1965] is a serious warning addressed to the Bonn militarists that an attack on the GDR will conjure up their own demise."

The number of such leaflet drops was immense. During the 1950s, West Germany sent millions of propaganda leaflets into East Germany each year. In 1968 alone, over 4,000 projectiles containing some 450,000 leaflets were fired from East Germany into the West. Another 600 waterproof East German leaflet containers were recovered from cross-border rivers. The "leaflet war" was eventually ended by mutual agreement in the early 1970s as part of the normalisation of relations between the two German states.

== See also ==
- Grepo
- Crossing the inner German border
- Development of the inner German border
- Fortifications of the inner German border
- Escape attempts and victims of the inner German border
- Fall of the inner German border
