= Escape attempts and victims of the inner German border =

There were numerous escape attempts and victims of the inner German border during its 45 years of existence from 1945 to 1990.

== Refugee flows and escape attempts ==
Between 1945 and 1988, around 4 million East Germans migrated to the West. 3.454 million of them left between 1945 and the construction of the Berlin Wall in 1961. The great majority simply walked across the border or, after 1952, exited through West Berlin. After the border was fortified and the Berlin Wall was constructed, the number of illegal border crossings fell drastically. The numbers fell further as the border defenses were improved over the subsequent decades. In 1961, 8,507 people fled across the border, most of them through West Berlin. The construction of the Berlin Wall that year reduced the number of escapees by 75% to around 2,300 per annum for the rest of the decade. The Wall changed Berlin from being one of the easiest places to cross the border, from the East, to one of the most difficult between 1980 and 1988. However, escapees were never more than a small minority of the total number of emigrants from East Germany. Far more people left the country after being granted official permits, by fleeing through third countries or by being ransomed to the West German government. During the 1980s, only about 1% of those who left East Germany did so by escaping across the border.

East German Refugees, 1961–1988
	Total	Official permits	Escapes through other countries	Direct escapes	Ransomed to West Germany
1962–70	229,652	146,129	56,970	21,105	5,448
1971–79	131,176	85,434	27,576	7,816	10,350
1980–88	203,619	150,918	36,152	2,672	13,872
Total (+ 1961)	616,066	382,481	163,815	40,100	29,670

Escapees had various motives for attempting to flee East Germany. The vast majority had an essentially economic motive: they wished to improve their living conditions and opportunities in the West. Some fled for political reasons, but many were impelled to leave by specific social and political events. The imposition of collective agriculture and the crushing of the 1953 East German uprising prompted thousands to flee to the West, as did further coercive economic restructuring in 1960. Thousands of those who fled did so to escape the clearance of their villages along the border. By the 1980s, the number of escape attempts was rising again as East Germany's economy stagnated and living conditions deteriorated.

Attempts to flee across the border were carefully studied and recorded by the East German authorities to identify possible weak points. These were addressed by strengthening the fortifications in vulnerable areas. The East German Army (NVA) and the Ministry for State Security (Stasi) carried out statistical surveys to identify trends. In one example, a study was carried out by the NVA at the end of the 1970s to review attempted "border breaches" (Grenzdurchbrüche). It found that 4,956 people had attempted to escape across the border between 1 January 1974 and 30 November 1979. Of those, 3,984 people (80.4%) were arrested by the People's Police in the Sperrzone, the outer restricted zone. 205 people (4.1%) were caught at the signal fence. Within the inner security zone, the Schutzstreifen, a further 743 people (15%) were arrested by the border guards. 48 people (1%) were stopped – i.e. killed or injured – by landmines and 43 people (0.9%) by SM-70 directional mines on the border fence. A further 67 people (1.35%) were intercepted at the border fence (shot and/or arrested). The study highlighted the effectiveness of the SM-70 as a means of stopping people getting across the fence. A total of 229 people – just 4.6% of attempted escapees, representing less than one in twenty – made it across the border fence. Of these, the largest number (129, or 55% of successful escapees) succeeded in making it across the fence in unmined sectors. 89 people (39% of escapees) managed to cross both the minefields and the border fence, but just 12 people (6% of the total) succeeded in getting past the SM-70s.

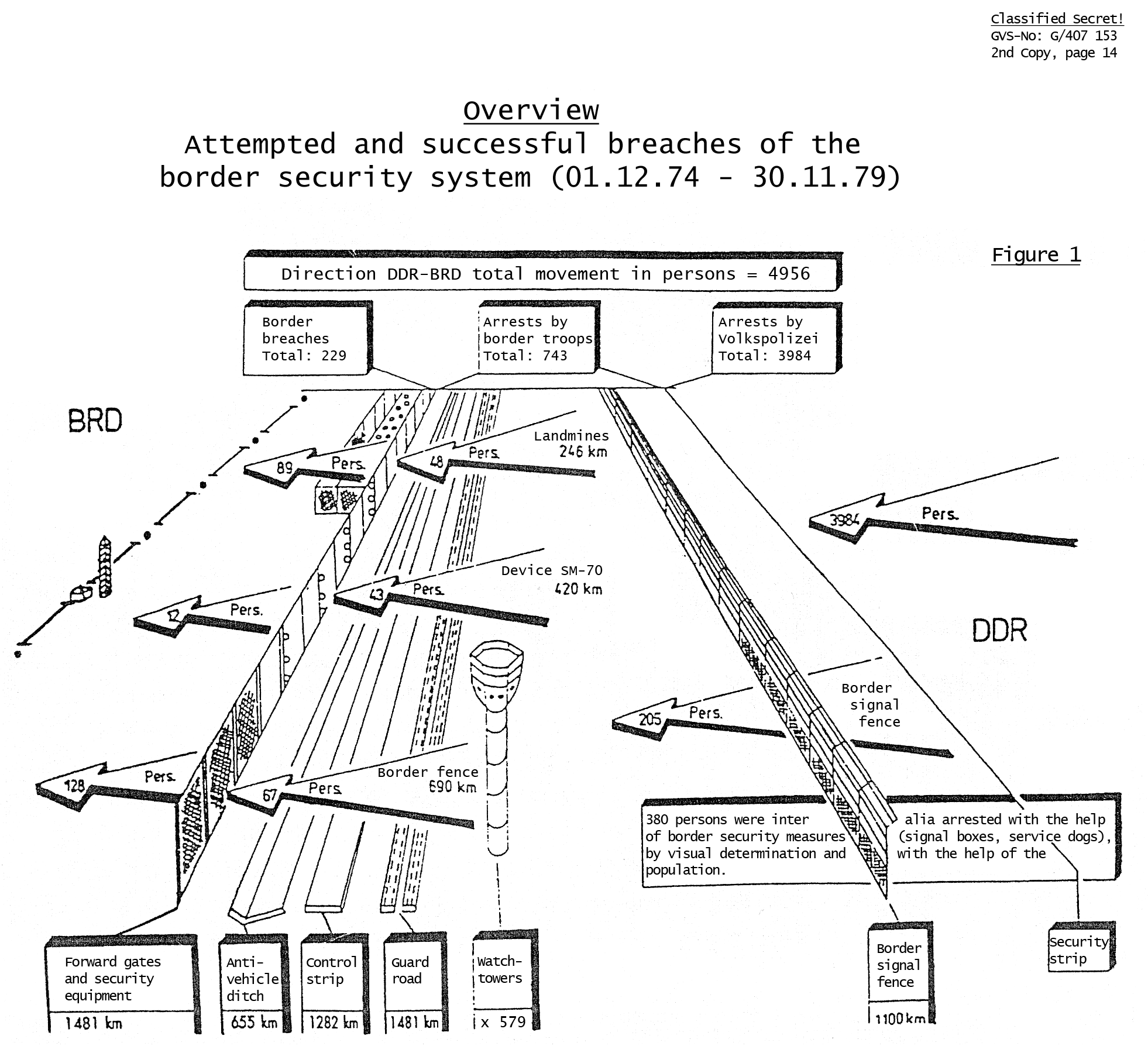
East German Army diagram detailing numbers of escape attempts on the inner German border, 1974–1979

Escape attempts were severely punished by the East German state. From 1953, the regime described the act of escaping as Republikflucht (literally "flight from the Republic"), by analogy with the existing military term Fahnenflucht ("desertion"). A successful escapee was not a Flüchtling ("refugee") but a Republikflüchtiger ("Republic-deserter"). Those who attempted to escape were called Sperrbrecher (literally "blockade runners" but more loosely translated as "border violators"). Those who helped escapees were not Fluchthelfer ("escape helpers"), the Western term, but Menschenhändler ("human traffickers"). Such ideologically coloured language enabled the regime to portray border crossers as little better than traitors and criminals. An East German propaganda booklet published in 1955 outlined the official view of escapees:

Both from the moral standpoint as well as in terms of the interests of the whole German nation, leaving the GDR is an act of political and moral backwardness and depravity.

Those who let themselves be recruited objectively serve West German Reaction and militarism, whether they know it or not. Is it not despicable when for the sake of a few alluring job offers or other false promises about a "guaranteed future" one leaves a country in which the seed for a new and more beautiful life is sprouting, and is already showing the first fruits, for the place that favors a new war and destruction?

Is it not an act of political depravity when citizens, whether young people, workers, or members of the intelligentsia, leave and betray what our people have created through common labor in our republic to offer themselves to the American or British secret services or work for the West German factory owners, Junkers, or militarists? Does not leaving the land of progress for the morass of an historically outdated social order demonstrate political backwardness and blindness? ...

[W]orkers throughout Germany will demand punishment for those who today leave the German Democratic Republic, the strong bastion of the fight for peace, to serve the deadly enemy of the German people, the imperialists and militarists.

Republikflucht became a crime in 1957, punishable by heavy fines and up to three years' imprisonment. Any act associated with an escape attempt was subject to this legislation. Those caught in the act were often tried for espionage as well and given proportionately harsher sentences. More than 75,000 people – an average of more than seven people a day – were imprisoned for attempting to escape across the border, serving an average of one to two years' imprisonment.

Some of the people who tried to escape were in fact East German guards or soldiers. Some of them used military vehicles to smash through the Berlin wall. Guards who attempted to escape were treated much more harshly and were on average imprisoned for five years. Those who helped escapees were also subject to punishment, facing prison terms or deportation to internal exile in faraway towns. Some 50,000 East Germans suffered this fate between 1952 and 1989.

== Escape methods ==
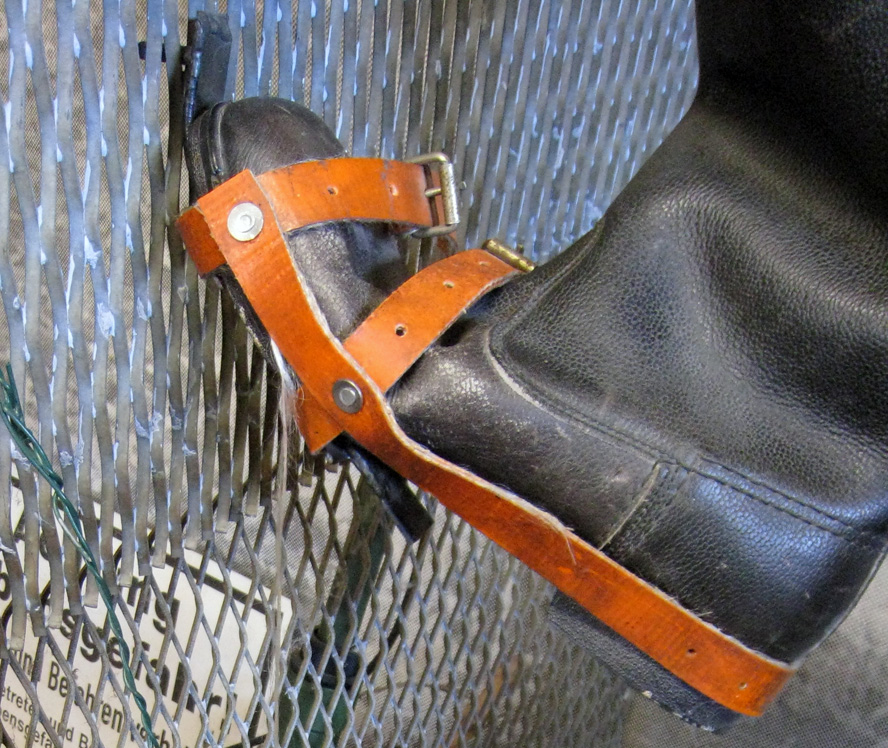
Boot modified with metal hooks to enable the wearer to climb the border fence

Refugees used a variety of methods to escape across the border. The great majority crossed on foot, though some took more unusual routes. One of the most spectacular was the balloon escape in September 1979 of eight people from two families in a home-made hot-air balloon. Their flight involved an ascent to more than 2,500 metres (8,200 ft) before landing near the West German town of Naila, inspiring the 1982 film Night Crossing and the 2018 film Balloon. The three Bethke brothers escaped on separate occasions by floating an air mattress across the Elbe, ziplining over the Berlin Wall, and flying ultralight aircraft into East Berlin and back. Another attempt to escape with an ultralight aircraft involved the homebuilt Wagner DOWA 81, but has been stopped before it could be performed.

Other escapees relied more on physical strength and endurance. An escapee in 1987 used meat hooks to scale the border fences, while in 1971 a doctor swam 45 kilometres (28 mi) across the Baltic Sea from Rostock almost to the Danish island of Lolland before he was picked up by a West German yacht. Another escapee used an air mattress to escape across the Baltic in 1987. Mass escapes were rare. One of the few that succeeded took place on 2 October 1961, when 53 people from the border village of Böseckendorf – a quarter of the village's population – escaped en masse, followed by another 13 inhabitants in February 1963. An unusual mass escape occurred in September 1964 when 14 East Germans, including eleven children, were smuggled across the border in a refrigerated truck. They were able to escape detection by being concealed under the carcasses of slaughtered and stuffed pigs being transported to the West.

Those working on or near the border were occasionally able to use their privileged access and knowledge to escape. For the border guards, this presented special dangers, as their colleagues were under orders to shoot without warning if an escape attempt was made. The dilemmas they faced were highlighted in the May 1969 defection of a soldier and a non-commissioned officer (NCO) of the Grenztruppen. When the NCO made his escape, the soldier, Jürgen Lange, decided not to shoot him. As this exposed Lange to severe punishment by his superiors for disobeying the order to shoot, Lange made his own escape ten minutes later. When he reached the West German side, Lange found that his rifle had been sabotaged by his NCO to prevent him firing in the first place. Soviet soldiers also sometimes escaped across the border, though this was less common. Only eight such defections succeeded between 1953 and 1984.

The traffic was not solely one-way; thousands of people a year migrated from West Germany to East Germany. The East German press described such individuals as "west zone refugees" who were fleeing "political pressure", "growing unlawfulness", or "worsening economic conditions". Research carried out by the West German government found more prosaic reasons, such as marital problems, family estrangement, and the homesickness of those who had lived in East Germany in the past. A number of Allied military personnel, including British, French, West German, and United States troops, also defected. By the end of the Cold War, as many as 300 United States citizens were thought to have defected across the Iron Curtain for a variety of reasons – whether to escape criminal charges, for political reasons, or because (as the St. Petersburg Times put it) "girl-hungry GIs [were tempted] with seductive sirens, who usually desert the love-lorn soldier once he is across the border." The fate of such defectors varied considerably. Some were sent straight to labour camps on charges of espionage. Others committed suicide, while a few were able to find wives and work on the eastern side of the border.

== Order to fire ==
From 1945 onwards, unauthorised crossers of the inner German border risked being shot by Soviet or East German border guards. The use of deadly force was termed the Schießbefehl ("order to fire" or "command to shoot"). It was formally in force as early as 1948, when regulations concerning the use of firearms on the border were promulgated. A regulation issued to East German police 27 May 1952 stipulated that "failure to obey the orders of the Border Patrol will be met by the use of arms." From the 1960s to the end of the 1980s, the border guards were given daily verbal orders (Vergatterung) to "track down, arrest or annihilate border violators." The GDR formally codified its regulations on the use of deadly force in March 1982, when the State Border Law mandated that firearms were to be used as the "maximum measure in the use of force" against individuals who "publicly attempt to break through the state border". The GDR's leadership explicitly endorsed the use of deadly force. General Heinz Hoffmann, the GDR Minister of Defence, declared in August 1966 that "anyone who does not respect our border will feel the bullet." In 1974, Erich Honecker, as Chairman of the National Defense Council of East Germany, ordered: "Firearms are to be ruthlessly used in the event of attempts to break through the border, and the comrades who have successfully used their firearms are to be commended."

East German border guards had a standard procedure to follow if they detected unauthorised individuals in the border zone. (Though the West Germans referred to the control strip as a "death strip", deadly force could be used at any location along the border – it did not depend on an individual's being in, or crossing, the control strip.) If the individual was less than 100 metres (330 ft) away, the border guard would first order: "Stop! Border sentry! Hands up!" ("Halt! Grenzposten! Hände hoch!") or "Stop, stand still, or I will shoot!" ("Halt! Stehenbleiben, oder ich schieße!"). If the individual was further away or on the Western side of the border fence the guard was authorised to shoot without warning. If the escapee was a fellow border guard, he could be shot immediately from any distance without prior warning. Border guards were instructed not to shoot if innocent bystanders might be hit or if the escapee had made it into West German territory, or if the line of fire was into West Germany. In practice, though, shots fired from East Germany often landed in West German territory.

The border guards were under considerable pressure to obey the Schießbefehl. If they shot escapees they were rewarded with medals, bonuses, and sometimes promotion. In one typical example, the killers of one would-be escapee in East Berlin in February 1972 were rewarded by being decorated with the "Order of Merit of the Border Troops of the GDR" and a bonus of 150 marks. By contrast, failure to shoot or suspicion that a shooter had deliberately missed was punished.

The Schießbefehl was, not surprisingly, very controversial in the West and was singled out for criticism by the West Germans. The West German authorities established a "Central Recording Office" to record details of deaths on the border, with the ultimate aim of prosecuting the offenders. This significantly discomfited the East German authorities, who repeatedly but unsuccessfully demanded the office's closure. The GDR authorities occasionally suspended the Schießbefehl on occasions when it would have been politically inconvenient to have to explain dead refugees, such as during a visit to the GDR by the French foreign minister in 1985. It was also a problem for many of the East German border guards and was the motivating factor behind a number of escapes, when guards facing a crisis of confidence defected because of their unwillingness to shoot fellow citizens.

== Deaths on the border ==
It is not known how many people died on the inner German border or who they were, as East Germany treated such information as a closely guarded secret. Confirmed fatality numbers have risen steadily since unification, as evidence has been gathered from East German records. Current unofficial estimates put the figure at up to 1,100 people, though officially released figures give a lower count for the death toll before and after the Berlin Wall was built.

People killed crossing the East German borders before and after 13 August 1961: figures as of 2000
	Before 13 August 1961 (1)	After 13 August 1961 (1)	Total (1)	Total (2)
Inner German border	100	271	371	290
Berlin border/Wall	16	239	255	96
Baltic Sea	15	174	189	17
GDR border guards	11	16	27	–
Soviet troops	1	5	6	–
Berlin ring road	–	–	–	90
Aircraft shot down	14	3	17	–
Total	160	753	916	519

(1) Figures from the Arbeitsgemeinschaft 13. August
(2) Figures from the Zentrale Erfassungsstelle für Regierungs- und Vereinigungskriminalität

There were many ways to die on the inner German border. Some escapees were shot by the border guards, while others were killed by mines and booby-traps. A substantial number drowned while trying to cross the Baltic and the Elbe river. Some died of heart attacks during their escape attempts; in one incident, a baby died after its parents gave it sleeping pills to keep it quiet during the crossing. A 2014 news report estimated that over 5,600 tried to escape via the Baltic Sea between 1961 and 1989, but fewer than 1,000 were successful.

Not all of those killed on the border were attempting to escape. On 13 October 1961, Westfälische Rundschau journalist Kurt Lichtenstein was shot on the border near the village of Zicherie after he attempted to speak with East German farm workers. His death aroused condemnation across the political spectrum in West Germany; he was a former parliamentary representative of the German Communist Party. The incident prompted students from Braunschweig to erect a sign on the border protesting the killing. An apparent mix-up over papers at a border crossing point led to the shooting of Benito Corghi, an Italian truck driver, in August 1976. Corghi was a member of the Italian Communist Party, which denounced the killing. The episode severely embarrassed the East German government and produced an unusual apology. In one notorious shooting on 1 May 1976, a former East German political prisoner, Michael Gartenschläger, who had fled to the West some years before, was ambushed and killed by a Stasi commando squad on the border near Büchen as he tried to dismantle an SM-70 anti-personnel mine. When his body was buried it was described merely as an "unknown body fished out of the water". The Stasi's after-action report, however, declared that "before he could carry out the act [of removing the mine], Gartenschläger was liquidated by security forces of the GDR".

Twenty-five East German border guards died after being shot from the Western side of the border or by resisting escapees or (often accidentally) by their own colleagues. The East German government described them as "victims of armed assaults and imperialist provocations against the state border of the GDR" and alleged that "bandits" in the West took potshots at border guards doing their duty – a version of events that was uncorroborated by Western accounts of border incidents.

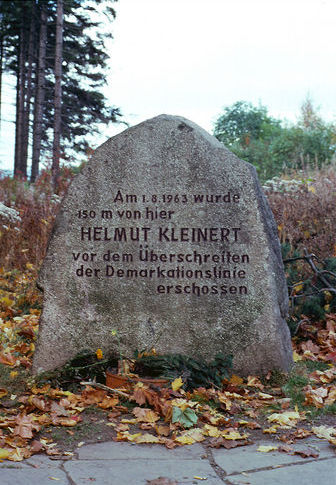
West German memorial to Helmut Kleinert, shot dead on the border on 1 August 1963.

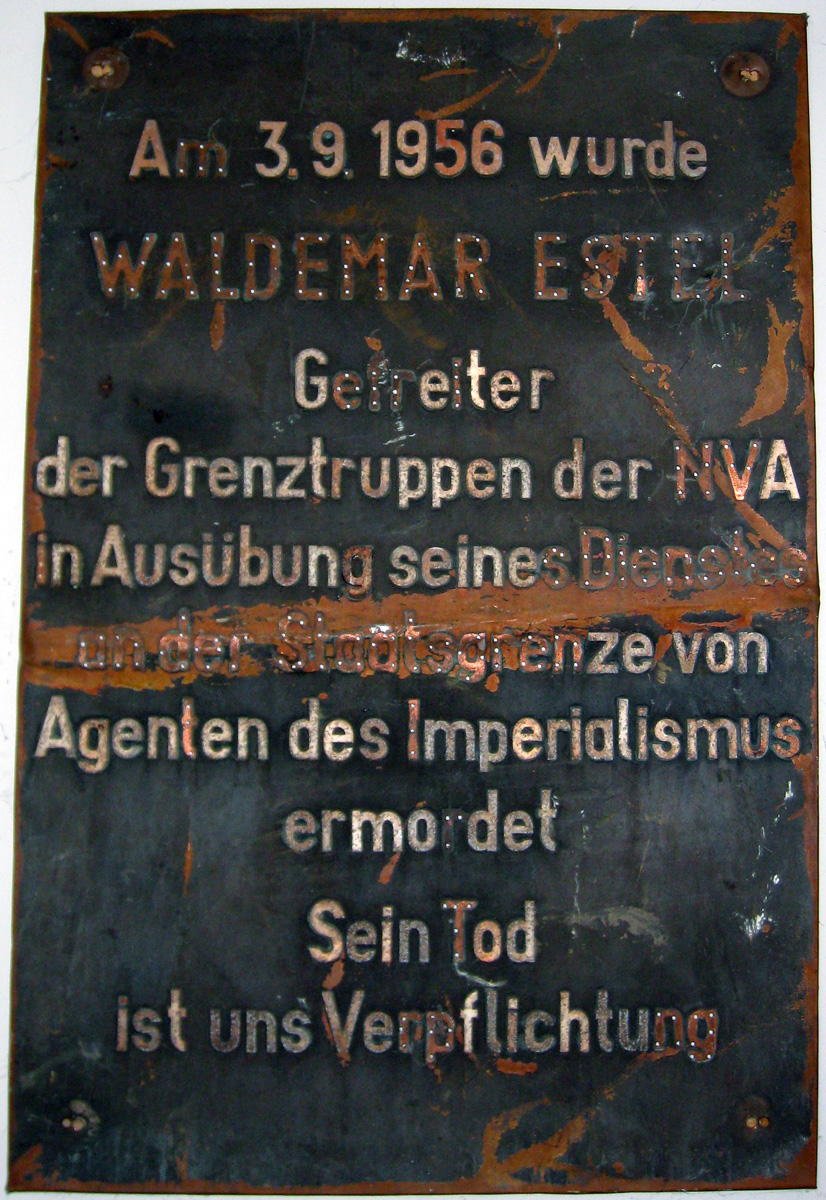
East German memorial to border guard Waldemar Estel, killed by "imperialist agents" on 3 September 1956.

The two sides commemorated their dead in significantly different ways. Various, mostly unofficial, memorials were set up on the western side by people seeking to commemorate victims of the border. West Germans such as Michael Gartenschläger and Kurt Lichtenstein were commemorated with signs and memorials, some of which were supported by the government. After the policy of détente was initiated in the 1970s this became politically inconvenient and state support for border memorials largely ceased. The taboo in East Germany surrounding escapees meant that the great majority of deaths went unpublicised and uncommemorated. The border guards who died on the frontier were, however, portrayed as "martyrs" by the East German regime. Four stone memorials were erected in East Berlin to mark their deaths. The regime named schools, barracks and other public facilities after the dead guards and used their memorials as places of pilgrimage to signify that (as a slogan put it) "their deaths are our commitment" to maintaining the border. After 1989 the memorials were vandalised, neglected and ultimately removed.

Few East German escapees were commemorated in the West, not least because their identities were mostly unknown until after 1989. One notable exception was Helmut Kleinert, a 23-year-old from Quedlinburg in Saxony-Anhalt who was machine-gunned to death on 1 August 1963 as he and his 22-year-old pregnant wife attempted to cross the border near Hohegeiß in the Harz mountains. A memorial dedicated to "The Unknown" was soon erected by local people on the western side of the border. When Kleinert's identity became known in the West, his name was added to the memorial. It became something of a shrine with piles of flowers and wreaths deposited by visitors. The East German regime strongly objected and erected a watchtower nearby, from which threats and communist propaganda were broadcast across the border. Ultimately, in August 1971, the memorial was replaced by a stone set 150 metres (490 ft) away and out of sight of the border.

== See also ==
- Border guards of the inner German border
- Crossing the inner German border
- Development of the inner German border
- Fall of the inner German border
- Fortifications of the inner German border
- List of deaths at the Berlin Wall
