= British Frontier Service =

British border patrol in West Germany

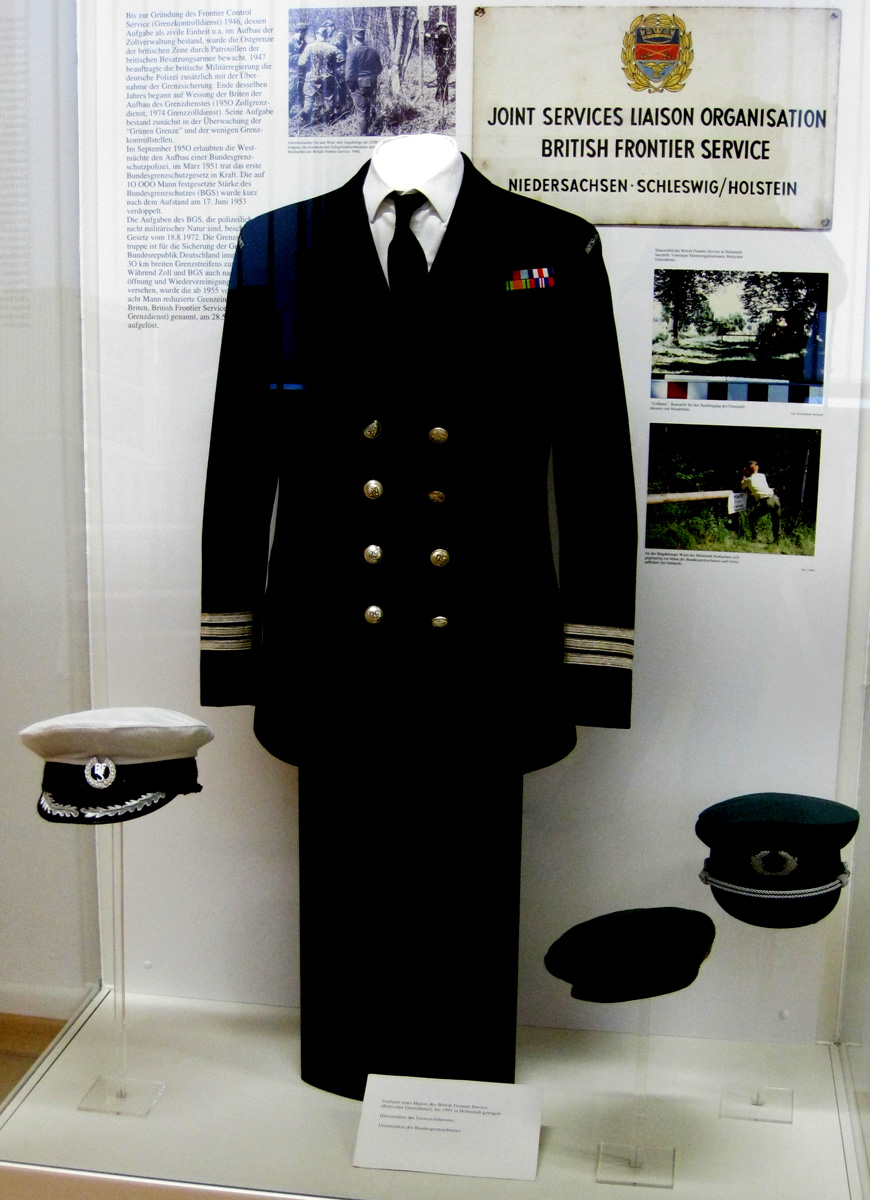
Uniform, headgear and headquarters sign of the British Frontier Service

The British Frontier Service was a British government organisation that was responsible for border monitoring duties in West Germany between 1946 and 1991. Its personnel served on Germany's international borders with Denmark, the Netherlands and Belgium before focusing on the inner German border. It was charged with a number of tasks, including assisting the movements of British military personnel and their dependents, monitoring the border regions and helping to defuse border incidents. It was ultimately disbanded following German reunification.

== Establishment of the British Frontier Service ==
Following the end of the Second World War, British troops in Germany were deployed along the international borders of the British zone of Allied-occupied Germany to control the flow of refugees and prevent smuggling. They were replaced in 1946 by the Frontier Control Service, a civilian frontier force administered by the British Control Commission of Germany. It went through a series of names thereafter: the Frontier Control Service from 1946 to 1949; the Frontier Inspection Service, 1949–55; and British Frontier Service, 1955–91.

Many of its members were recruited from the Royal Marines, the Royal Navy and the British Army. Its first director was a Royal Navy officer, Captain Guy Maund DSO. It was under his leadership that the BFS adopted its distinctive naval-style uniform with silver rank badges. Its personnel were given honorary Army ranks, with its director given the rank of full colonel.

The BFS initially had 300 personnel, augmented by remaining personnel from the German customs service. Former German customs officials were released from prisoner of war camps and put to work carrying out day-to-day border control duties, while the BFS concentrated on preventing illegal activities such as smuggling and unauthorised border crossings. For the first few years after the war it concentrated almost entirely on Germany's borders with Belgium, Denmark and the Netherlands, leaving the border of the Soviet occupation zone almost entirely unguarded. This changed after the Berlin Blockade of 1948-49 and the increasing flow of illegal imports from the Soviet zone. The BFS and the newly established West German Zollgrenzdienst (Federal Customs Service) were deployed along what became the inner German border from Lübeck down to Göttingen, a distance of some 660 kilometres (410 mi).

== Changes to the role of the BFS ==
In 1955 the British Control Commission was wound up when sovereignty was passed from the Western Allies to the West German state. The BFS underwent drastic changes, passing from the jurisdiction of the British Foreign and Commonwealth Office to that of the War Office, later the Ministry of Defence (although it remained a civilian organisation). Its staff was reduced from around 300 personnel to 38, and it lost many of its executive responsibilities. A limited number of its staff worked on the eastern border but the majority worked at transit points as liaison with the German border authorities. They assisted with the movements of members of the British armed forces in Germany and their dependents, under the Status of Forces Agreement with West Germany. The headquarters of the BFS was moved to Wahner Heide near Bonn – now Cologne Bonn Airport – where it was administered as part of the Joint Services Liaison Organization. Its operations along the eastern border were administered from a regional headquarters at Hannover. Additional regional liaison offices were located in Berlin, Düsseldorf and Helmstedt, near the main border crossing (Checkpoint Alpha) on the Hanover-Berlin autobahn.

The BFS went through further changes in 1967, when it was established as a permanent Civil Service organisation. Its role changed again in 1972 following the signature of the Treaty on the Basis of Relations between East and West Germany, when the two states agreed to recognise each other. The British government took the view at this point that the United Kingdom was no longer responsible for the inner German border and considered eliminating the BFS altogether. However, it was decided that it would continue to have a very limited role on the border, chiefly involving conducting liaison with the German border agencies. It was reduced to 16 members with only the British Frontier Post at Helmstedt, staffed by four personnel, remaining open. The BFS was finally dissolved on 28 May 1991, following the reunification of Germany.

== BFS on the ground ==
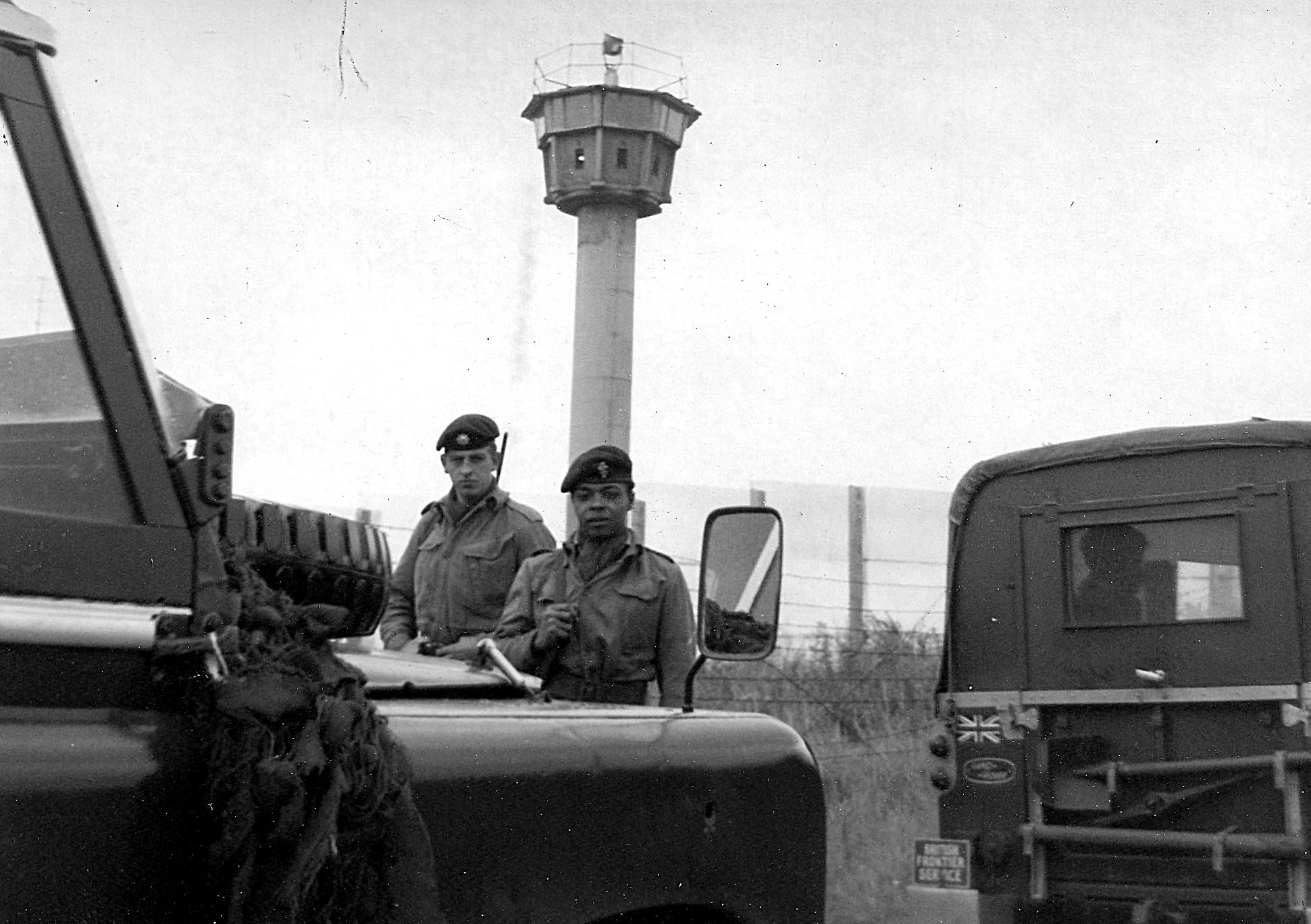
Joint British Army – British Frontier Service patrol near Helmstedt, early 1970s

Between 1955 and 1972, the BFS played a front-line role in managing tensions on the inner German border. Its officers were called to the scene of border incidents or unusual activity to defuse disputes and provide an independent British view of situations. They dealt with a wide variety of incidents ranging from escapes over the East German border fortifications, to intruding East German border markers, or attempts to block West German boats along the disputed river border on the Elbe. West German customs or Bundesgrenzschutz (BGS Federal Border Protection) personnel would deal directly with the East Germans with the BFS officer providing advice.

The BFS also assisted the British Army in carrying out patrols of the inner German border. Its personnel were a familiar sight, guiding units of the British Army of the Rhine (BAOR) along the southern sector of the British zone from Lauenburg to Schmidekopf. Although the BAOR did not patrol the much shorter northern sector from Lübeck to Lauenburg, the BFS filled the gap with occasional "visits". It presented a somewhat odd appearance, described by The Times as "delightful, perhaps unique":

With its fleet of patrol cars, carrying built-in radio telephones and Union Jack badges, and its military language ("That's the drill, Arthur"), the BFS brings to mind some imperial field force of the 1880s, nearer-flung than of yore, for whose members, perhaps, the Elbe is a faint substitute for the Nile, the Zambezi or the Irrawaddy.

== Notable BFS personnel ==
Several BFS personnel were honoured for their work. Jack Owen, a BFS officer and former Royal Marine, was awarded an MBE in 1963 following a tense incident at Bohldamm near Lüchow in Lower Saxony. The border ran along a stream, but its precise location was disputed. The West Germans considered the far side of the stream to be the location of the border, while the East Germans regarded the border as lying in the middle of the stream. An overgrown cobbled footbridge crossed the stream but was blocked by the East Germans with a movable barbed wire trestle barrier situated at the far end of the bridge. One day in 1962 the East Germans moved the barrier to the middle of the bridge, despite protests from West German border guards and customs officials. The situation escalated when the East Germans warned that they would shoot anyone who touched the trestle and backed up their warning by emplacing machine guns and armoured cars on their side of the stream. The West Germans called up a BFS platoon and a British Army section to back them up. Owen called the East Germans' bluff by walking onto the bridge with two British soldiers and carrying the trestle back to the eastern side of the stream. He then stood by it for the next eight hours to make sure that it would not be moved again.

Tommy Jones, a former member of the Royal Military Police special investigations branch, became well known as a guide for Western journalists and visitors to the inner German border. Although he escorted around 4,000-5,000 visitors a year along the border, he averred that he "never [got] frustrated. It is important to show people this border. It is impossible to imagine it or to describe it." Jones arrived in Germany in 1945 during the British advance to the Elbe in the closing months of the Second World War and remained there for the next 45 years. He joined the BFS in 1960, moved to Helmstedt in 1974 and became the head of the BFS in 1983, by which time it had only four personnel left. In January 1990, he was awarded an MBE and retired to become a Chelsea Pensioner. His departure was noted not just by the West Germans with whom he had worked for so long, but by the East German border guards as well; as he put it, "For 16 years at Helmstedt, the East German border guards never spoke to me... All they did was take pictures of me from behind bushes. When the border was opened, suddenly the East German guards decided they wanted to try and shake my hand. But I didn't feel like shaking their hands."
