= Development of the inner German border =

Evolution of fortifications between East and West Germany during the Cold War

The development of the inner German border took place in a number of stages between 1945 and the mid-1980s. After its establishment in 1945 as the dividing line between the Western and Soviet occupation zones of Germany, in 1949 the inner German border became the frontier between the Federal Republic of Germany (FRG, West Germany) and the German Democratic Republic (GDR, East Germany). The border remained relatively easy to cross until it was abruptly closed by the GDR in 1952 in response to the large-scale emigration of East Germans to the West. Barbed-wire fences and minefields were installed and draconian restrictions were placed on East German citizens living near the border. Thousands were expelled from their homes, with several thousand more fleeing to the West. From the late 1960s, the border fortifications were greatly strengthened through the installation of new fences, detectors, watchtowers and booby-traps designed to prevent attempts to escape from East Germany. The improved border defences succeeded in reducing the scale of unauthorised emigration to a trickle.

== Origins ==
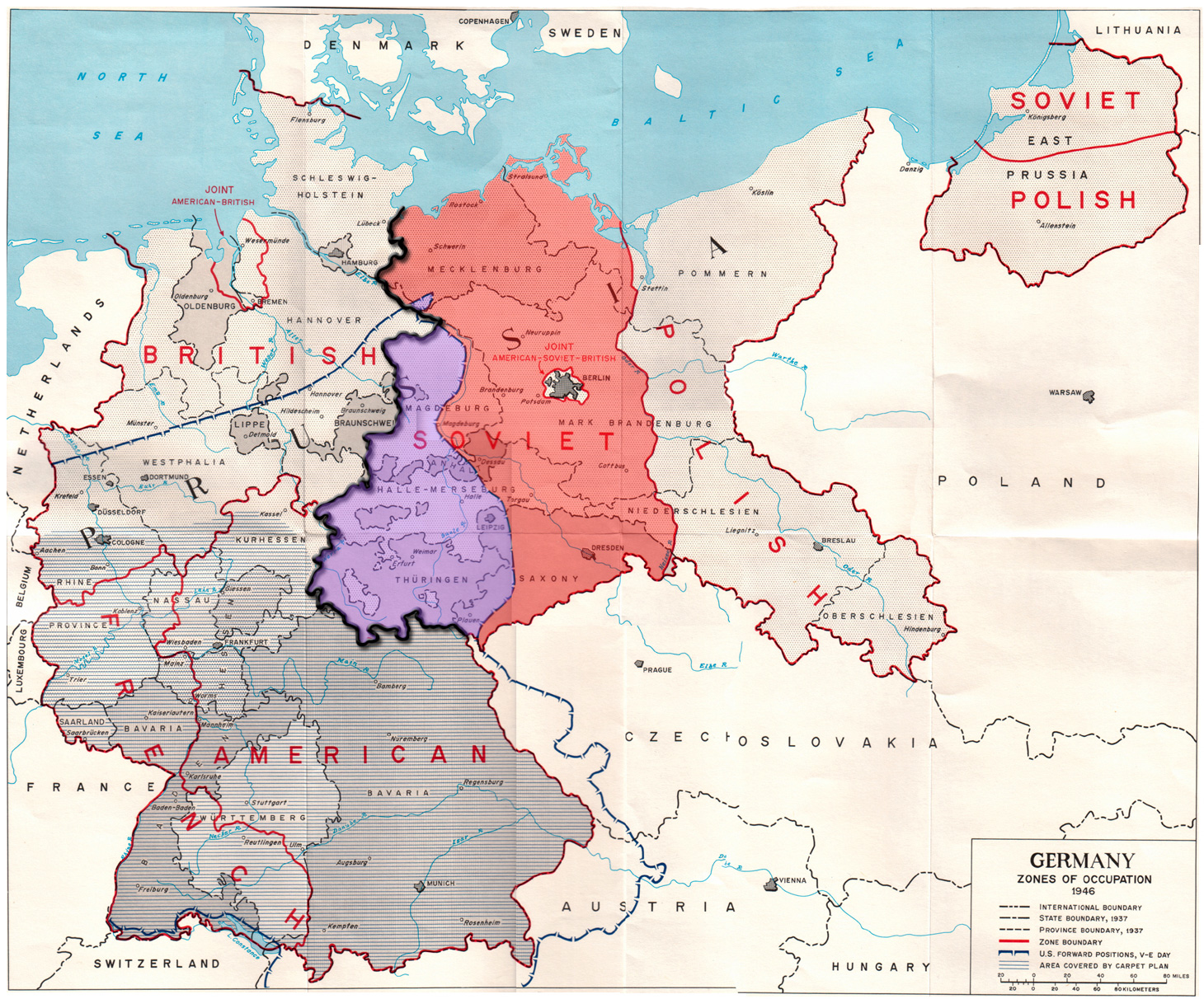
The Allied zones of occupation in post-war Germany, highlighting the Soviet zone (red), the inner German border (heavy black line) and the zone from which British and American troops withdrew in July 1945 (purple). The provincial boundaries are those of Nazi Germany, before the present Länder were established.

The inner German border owed its origins to the agreements reached at the Tehran Conference in November–December 1943. The conference established the European Advisory Commission (EAC) to outline proposals for the partition of a defeated Germany into British, American and Soviet occupation zones (a French occupation zone was established later). At the time, Germany was divided into the series of gaue – Nazi administrative subdivisions – that had succeeded the administrative divisions of Weimar Germany.

The demarcation line was based on a British proposal of 15 January 1944. It envisaged a line of control along the borders of the old states or provinces of Mecklenburg, Saxony, Anhalt and Thuringia, which had ceased to exist as separate entities when the Prussians unified Germany in 1871; minor adjustments were made for practical reasons. The British would occupy the north-west of Germany, the United States the south, and the Soviet Union the east. Berlin was to be a separate joint zone of occupation deep inside the Soviet zone. The rationale was to give the Soviets a powerful incentive to see the war through to the end. It would give the British an occupation zone that was physically close to the UK and on the coast, making it easier to resupply it from the UK. It was also hoped that the old domination of Prussia would be undermined.

The United States envisaged a very different division of Germany, with a large American zone in the north, a smaller zone for the Soviets in the east (the American and Soviet zones meeting at Berlin) and a smaller zone for the British in the south. President Franklin D. Roosevelt disliked the idea of a U.S. occupation zone in the south, because its supply routes would depend on access through France, which it was feared would be unstable following its liberation. One version of events (of at least two distinct versions of the circumstances of American approval), has it that to forestall anticipated American objections, the British proposal was presented directly to the EAC without the prior agreement of the Americans. The Soviets immediately accepted the proposal and left the U.S. with little choice but to accept it. The final division of Germany was thus mainly along the lines of the British proposal, with the Americans given the North Sea port-cities of Bremen and Bremerhaven as an enclave within the British zone to ease President Roosevelt's concerns about supply routes.

The division of Germany came into effect on 1 July 1945. Because of the unexpectedly rapid Allied advance in central Germany in the final weeks of the war, British and American troops occupied large areas of territory that had been assigned to the Soviet occupation zone. This included a broad area of what was to become the western parts of East Germany, as well as parts of Czechoslovakia and Austria. The redeployment of Western troops at the start of July 1945 was an unpleasant surprise for many German refugees, who had fled west to escape the Soviet advance. A fresh wave of refugees headed further west as the Americans and British withdrew and Soviet troops entered the areas allocated to the Soviet occupation zone.

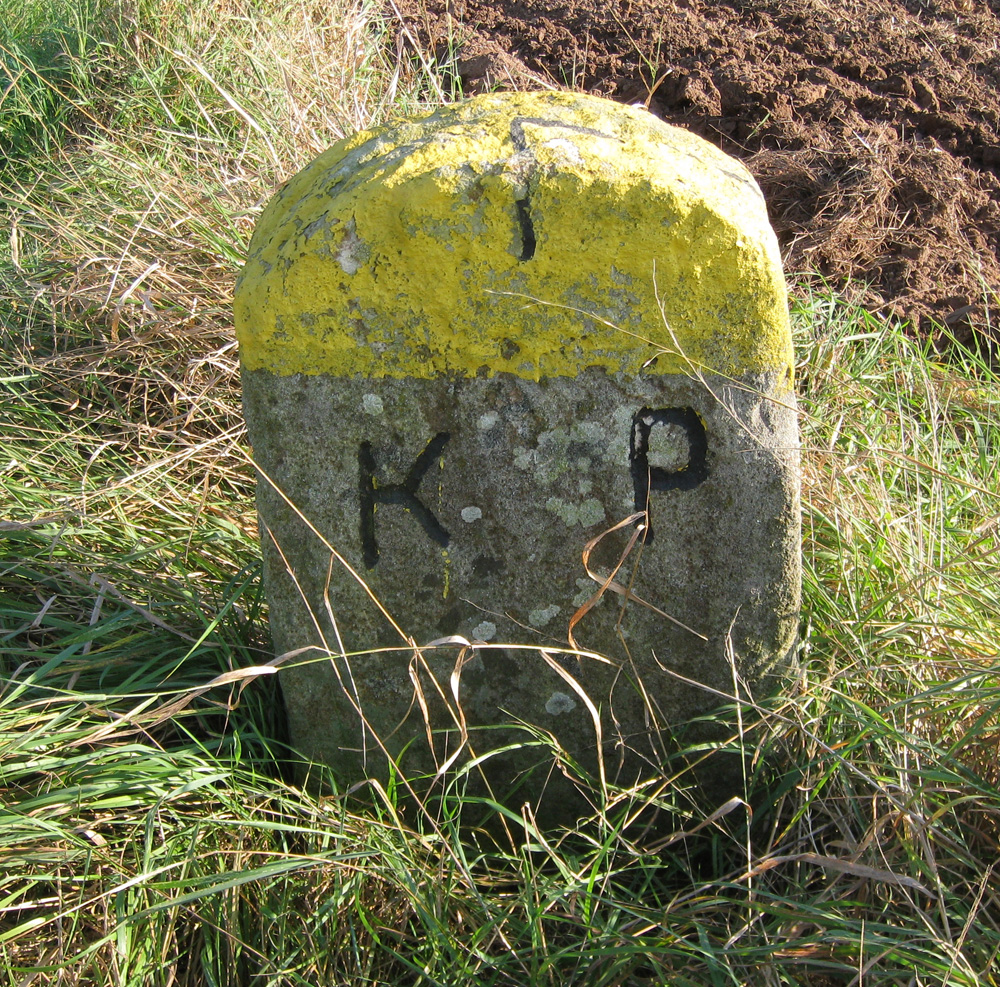
Border marker of the Kingdom of Prussia. The inner German border largely followed historic boundaries such as this one.

Following Germany's unconditional surrender in May 1945, the Allied Control Council (ACC) was formed under the terms of the Declaration on the Defeat of Germany, signed in Berlin on 5 June 1945. The council was "the highest authority for matters concerning the whole of Germany", on which the four powers – France, the UK, the U.S., and the USSR – were each represented by their supreme commander in Germany. The council functioned from 30 August 1945 until it was suspended on 20 March 1948, when cooperation between the Western Allies and the Soviets had broken down completely over the issue of Germany's political and economic future. In May 1949, the three western occupation zones were merged to form the Federal Republic of Germany (FRG), a democratically governed federal state with a market economy. The Soviets responded in October 1949 with the establishment of the German Democratic Republic (GDR), a highly centralised communist dictatorship organised along Stalinist lines. The former demarcation lines between the western and eastern zones had now become a de facto international frontier – the inner German border.

From the outset, West Germany did not accept the legitimacy of the East German state, and for many years regarded the East German government as an illegal organisation intent on depriving Germans of their constitutional rights. It had not been freely or fairly elected, and the creation of East Germany itself was a fait accompli by the East German Communists and their Soviet allies. This had important consequences for the inner German border. West Germany regarded German citizenship and rights as unitary, applying equally to East and West German citizens alike. An East German who escaped or was released to the West automatically entered into full enjoyment of those rights, including West German citizenship and social benefits. A would-be immigrant from another country who could get to East Germany could not be barred from entering West Germany across the internal border, which had great significance in later decades. West German laws were deemed to be applicable in the East; violations of human rights in East Germany could be prosecuted in the West. East Germans thus had a powerful incentive to move to the West, where they would enjoy greater freedom and economic prospects.

By contrast, the East German government defined the country as a legitimate state in its own right, not merely the "Soviet occupation zone" (sowjetische Besatzungszone) as West Germany referred to it. In the terminology of the GDR's rulers, West Germany was enemy territory (feindliches Ausland). It was portrayed as a capitalist, semi-fascist state that exploited its citizens, sought to regain the lost territories of the Third Reich, and stood opposed to the peaceful socialism of the GDR.

== 1945–52: the "Green Border" ==
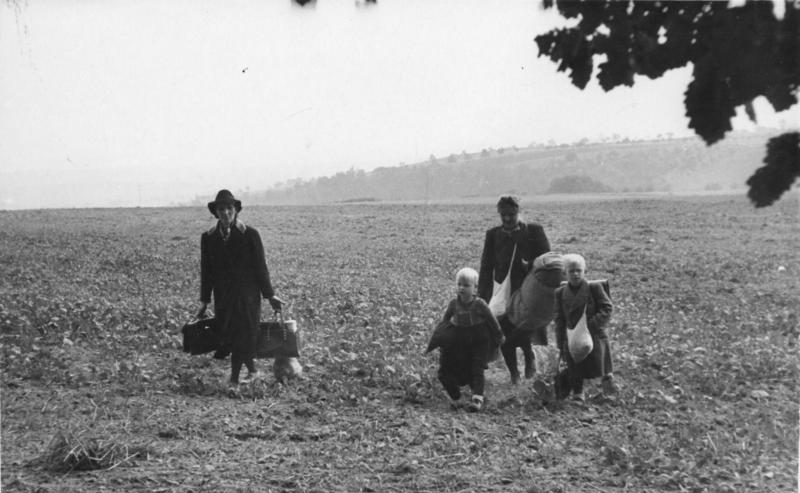
Illegal border crossers near Marienborn, 3 October 1949

In the early days of the occupation, the Allies maintained controls on the traffic between the zones within Germany as well as movements over Germany's international frontiers. The aim was to manage the flow of refugees and prevent the escape of former Nazi officials and intelligence officers. Travel restrictions in the western zones were gradually lifted as the western German economy improved. In the Soviet zone, however, the poverty and lack of personal freedom led to significant westward emigration. Between October 1945 and June 1946, 1.6 million Germans left the Soviet zone for the west. In response, the Soviets persuaded the Allied Control Council to close all zonal borders on 30 June 1946 and introduce a system of interzonal passes.

The interzonal and international borders were initially controlled directly by the Allies. The situation was initially somewhat anarchic immediately after the war, with large numbers of refugees still in transit. On a number of occasions, Soviet and American troops mounted unauthorised expeditions into each other's zones to loot and kidnap, and there were incidents of unauthorised shooting across the demarcation line. It became apparent that the Allies by themselves could not effectively seal off the borders and interzonal boundaries. From the first quarter of 1946, newly trained German police forces under the control of the individual German states took on the task of patrolling the borders alongside Allied troops. (The pre-war Grenzpolizei (German national border police service) had been abolished because of its wartime takeover by the Nazis and infiltration by the SS.)

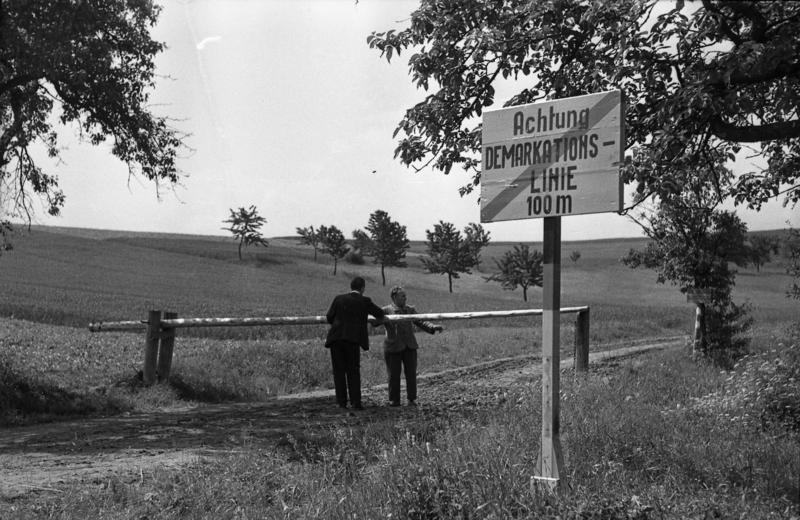
The border before fortification: inter-zonal barrier near Asbach in Thuringia, 1950

The east–west interzonal border became steadily more tense as the relationship between the Western Allies and the Soviets broke down. From September 1947 an increasingly strict control regime was imposed on the eastern boundary. The number of Soviet soldiers on the boundary was increased and supplemented with border guards from the newly established East German Volkspolizei ("People's Police"). The West Germans also stepped up border security with the establishment in 1952 of the Bundesgrenzschutz or BGS (Federal Border Guard), of 20,000 men. Allied troops (the British in the north, the Americans in the south) retained responsibility for the military security of the border.

The boundary line was nonetheless still fairly easy to cross. Local inhabitants could cross to maintain fields on the other side, or even to live on one side and work on the other. Those who were unable to obtain passes could usually bribe the border guards or sneak across. Refugees from the east, many of them Germans expelled from other countries in central and eastern Europe, were guided across the boundary by villagers in exchange for hefty fees. Other locals on both sides smuggled goods across to supplement their meagre incomes. The number of border migrants remained high despite the increase in East German security measures; 675,000 people fled to West Germany between 1949 and 1952.

There were major differences between how the Western and Eastern sides tackled illegal border crossings. Until the GDR officially acknowledged the inner German border as a "state border", those who were caught trying to cross it illegally could not be punished under passport control legislation; instead they were punished for crimes against the economy, principally sabotage. The Western side did not attempt to punish unauthorised crossings by civilians.

== 1952–67: the "Special Regime" ==
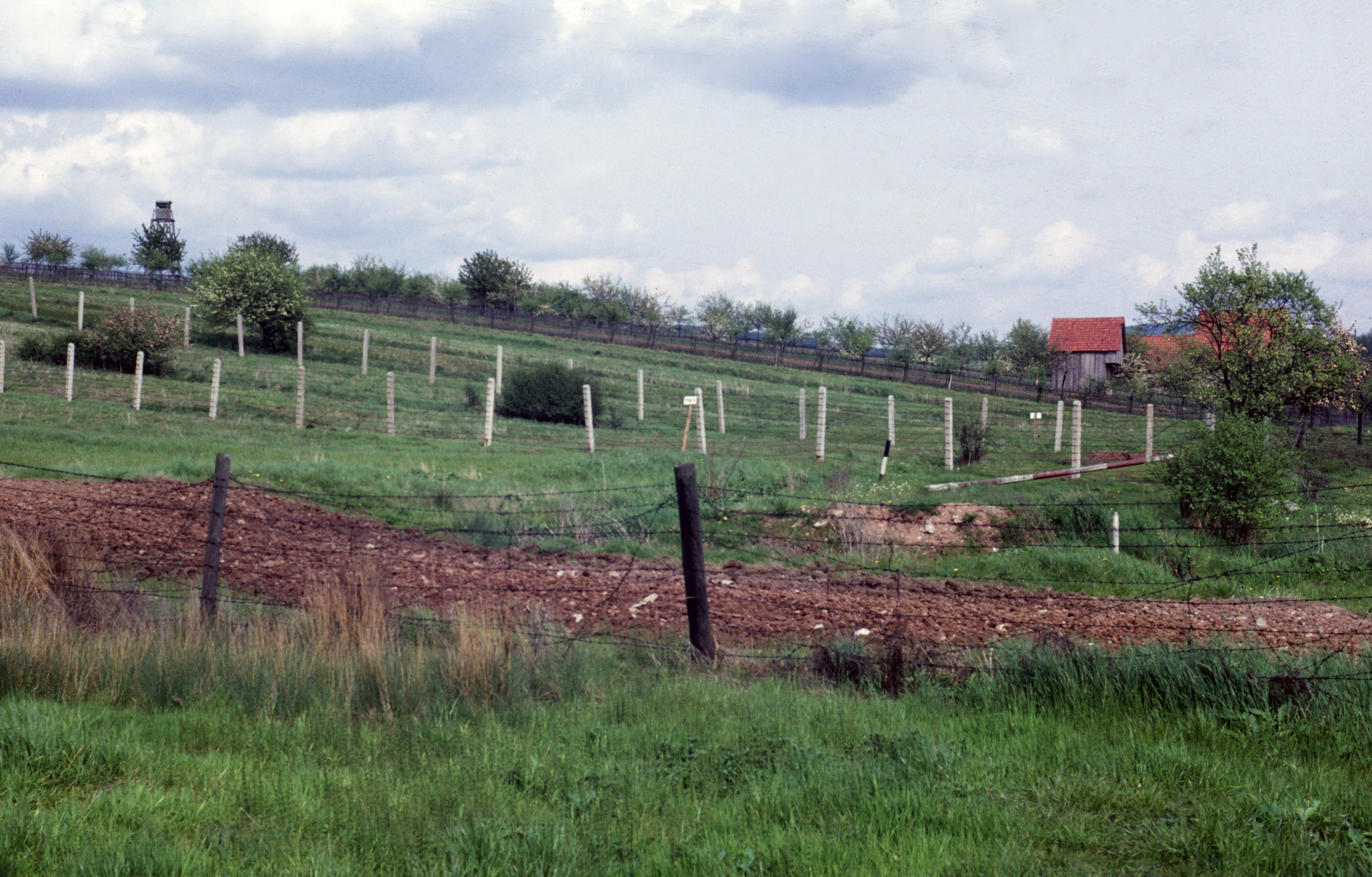
The newly strengthened border in 1962, with barbed-wire fences, watchtowers and minefields.

The border remained largely unfortified for several years after the East and West German republics were established in 1949, although by this time the GDR had already blocked many unofficial crossing points with ditches and barricades. This changed abruptly on 26 May 1952 when the GDR implemented a "special regime on the demarcation line", justified as a measure to keep out "spies, diversionists, terrorists and smugglers". In reality, though, the decision to fortify was taken because the GDR was haemorrhaging citizens at the rate of 10,000–20,000 a month, many of them from the skilled, educated and professional classes. The exodus threatened the viability of East Germany's already beleaguered economy. This was also of concern to the Soviets, who proposed a system of passes for visits of West Berlin residents to the territory of East Berlin and advised the East Germans to significantly improve their border defences.

The introduction of the "special regime" was carried out as abruptly as the construction of the Berlin Wall nine years later. A ploughed strip 10 m (32.8 ft) wide was created along the entire length of the inner German border. An adjoining "protective strip" (Schutzstreifen) 500 m (1,640 ft) wide was placed under severe restrictions. A "restricted zone" (Sperrzone) a further 5 km (3.1 mi) wide was created in which only those holding a special permit could live or work. Trees and brush were cut down along the border to clear lines of sight for the border guards and eliminate cover for would-be border crossers. Houses adjoining the border were torn down, bridges were closed and barbed-wire fencing was put up in many places. Tight restrictions were placed on farmers, who were permitted to work their fields along the border only in daylight hours and under the watch of armed border guards. The guards were authorised to use "weapons ... in case of failure to observe the orders of border patrols".

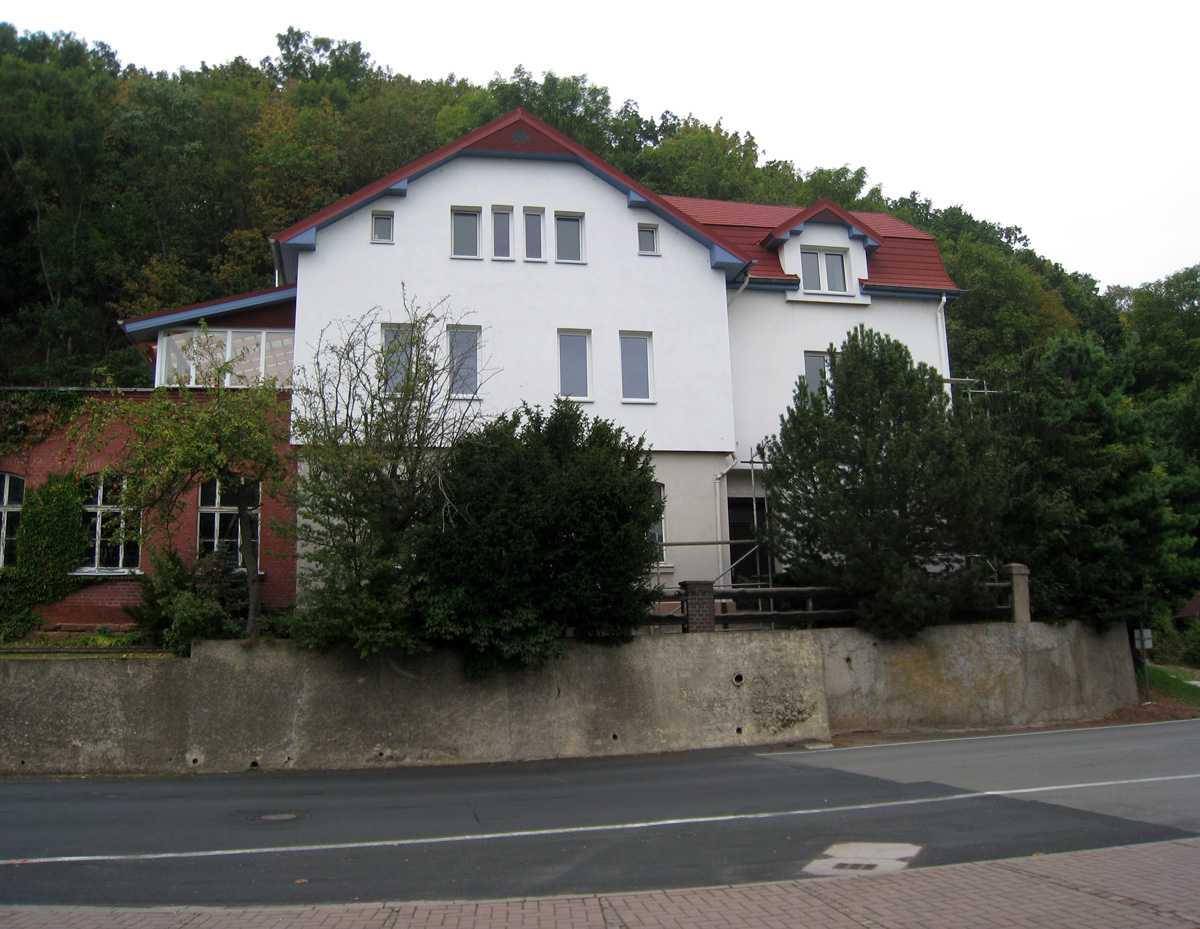
The Hoßfeld family house in Philippsthal was divided in two by the border, the line of which can be seen in the road surface.

The sudden closure of the border caused acute disruption for communities on both sides. Because the border had previously been merely an administrative boundary, homes, businesses, industrial sites and municipal amenities had been constructed straddling it, and some were now literally split down the middle. In Oebisfelde, residents could no longer access the shallow end of their swimming pool; in Buddenstedt, the border ran just behind the goal posts of a football field, putting the goalkeeper at risk of being shot by the border guards. An open-cast coal mine at Schöningen was split in half, causing Western and Eastern engineers to race to cart away equipment before the other side could seize it. Workers on both sides found themselves cut off from their homes and jobs. Farmers with land on the other side of the border effectively lost it, as they could no longer reach it. In Philippsthal, a house containing a printing shop was split in two by the border, which ran through the middle of the building. The doors leading to the East German portion of the building were bricked up and blocked until 1976. The disruption on the eastern side of the border was far worse. Some 8,369 civilians living in the Sperrgebiet were forcibly resettled in the GDR interior in a programme codenamed "Operation Vermin" (Aktion Ungeziefer). Those expelled from the border region included foreigners and those who had a criminal record, had failed to register with the police or "who because of their position in or toward society pose[d] a threat". Another 3,000 residents, realising that they were about to be expelled from their homes, fled to the West. By the end of 1952, the inner German border was virtually sealed.

The border between East and West Berlin was also significantly tightened, although it was not fully closed at this stage. By the end of September 1952, about 200 of the 277 streets which ran from the Western sectors to the East were closed to traffic and the remainder were subjected to constant police observation. Railway traffic was routed around the Western sectors and all employees of nationalised factories had to pledge not to visit West Berlin on pain of dismissal. However, even with these restrictions the border in Berlin remained considerably easier to cross than the main inner German border; consequently, Berlin became the main route by which East Germans left for the West. The outflow of people remained considerable despite the new restrictions. Between 1949 and the building of the Berlin Wall in 1961, an estimated 3.5 million East Germans – a sixth of East Germany's entire population – emigrated to the West. Events such as the crushing of the 1953 uprising and the shortages caused by the introduction of collectivisation resulted in major increases in refugee numbers. In August 1961, the Berlin Wall was built, finally putting an end to the stream of refugees. With the erection of the Wall, Berlin quickly went from being the easiest place to make an unauthorized crossing between East and West Germany to being the most difficult.

A further expansion of the border regime in July 1962 made the GDR's entire Baltic coast a border zone. A 500-metre (1,600 ft) wide strip on the eastern side of the Bay of Mecklenburg was added to the tightly controlled protective strip, while restrictions were imposed on coastal activities that might have been useful to would-be escapees. The use of boats at night was curtailed and they were required to moor only in designated areas. Camping and visitor accommodation in the coastal zone required official permission, and residents of the coastal zone required special passes to live there.

== 1967–89: the "Modern Frontier" ==
Towards the end of the 1960s, the GDR decided to upgrade the border to establish what East German leader Walter Ulbricht termed the "modern frontier" (die moderne Grenze). The redeveloped border system took advantage of the knowledge that had been obtained in building and maintaining the Berlin Wall: the border defences were systematically upgraded to make it far harder to cross; barbed-wire fences were replaced with harder-to-climb steel mesh; directional anti-personnel mines and anti-vehicle ditches were introduced to block the movement of people and vehicles; tripwires and electric signals were introduced to make it easier for the border guards to detect escapees; all-weather patrol roads were built to enable rapid access to any point along the border; and wooden guard towers were replaced with prefabricated concrete towers and observation bunkers.

Construction of the new border system started in September 1967. The first phase, from 1967 to 1972, was initially seen as a strengthening of weak points in the existing system; subsequently, it became a general rolling programme of work along the entire length of the border. Nearly 1,300 kilometres (808 mi) of new fencing was built, usually further back from the geographical border line than the old barbed-wire fences had been. The entire system was expected to be completed by 1975, but it continued well into the 1980s. The new border system had an immediate effect in reducing the number of escapes. During the mid-1960s, an average of about 1,000 people a year had made it across the border. Ten years later, that figure had fallen to about 120 per year.

At the same time, tensions between the two German states eased with the inauguration of West German Chancellor Willy Brandt's Ostpolitik. The Brandt government sought to normalise relations between West Germany and its eastern neighbours, and produced a series of treaties and agreements. Most significantly, on 21 December 1972 the two German states signed a treaty recognising each other's sovereignty and supporting each other's applications for UN membership (achieved in September 1973). Reunification remained a theoretical objective for West Germany, but in practice the issue was put to one side by the West and was abandoned entirely by the East. The agreement had significant implications for the border. The two Germanies established a border commission (Grenzkommission) which met from 1973 to the mid-1980s to resolve practical problems related to the border. The normalisation of relations also led to a slight relaxation in the regulations for crossing the border legally, although the border fortifications were as rigorously maintained as ever.

In 1988, the increasingly unsustainable costs of maintaining the border led the GDR leadership to propose replacing them with a high-technology system codenamed Grenze 2000. Drawing on technology used by the Red Army during the Soviet–Afghan War, it would have replaced the border fences with a network of signal tripwires, seismic detectors to detect footsteps, infrared beams, microwave detectors and other electronic sensors. It was never implemented, not least because of the high costs of construction, which were estimated at 257 million East German marks.

== See also ==
- Border guards of the inner German border
- Crossing the inner German border
- Escape attempts and victims of the inner German border
- Fortifications of the inner German border
