= Murder of Heinz-Josef Große =

Heinz-Josef Große
- Heinz-Josef Große, a casualty of the inner German border
- Born: 11 October 1947
- Died: 29 March 1982 (aged 34); Schifflersgrund, Thuringia
- Cause of death: Shooting

Heinz-Josef Große was a 34-year-old East German (GDR) construction worker who was shot and killed on 29 March 1982 by GDR border guards on the Inner German border at Schifflersgrund, near Bad Sooden-Allendorf.

He had been working on the border fortifications, digging cable trenches with a backhoe loader, when he noticed that the border guards were absent and that he was apparently unobserved. He drove his backhoe loader across the control strip and anti-vehicle ditch adjoining the border fence, lifted the bucket of his backhoe loader, climbed up on it and jumped over the fence. About 25 metres (82 ft) before he reached West German territory at the top of a short slope above the border fence, he was spotted by two East German border guards, who opened fire. He was struck by nine bullets fired from Kalashnikov rifles. Fatally wounded, he bled to death just inside GDR territory, while a West German border patrol – who saw the whole incident – stood by helplessly. In their subsequent report on the incident, the East German border guards stated that "the attempted breach of the border in the direction GDR-FRG was prevented by the use of firearms and the individual succumbed to fatal injuries."

The escape attempt of Heinz-Josef Große
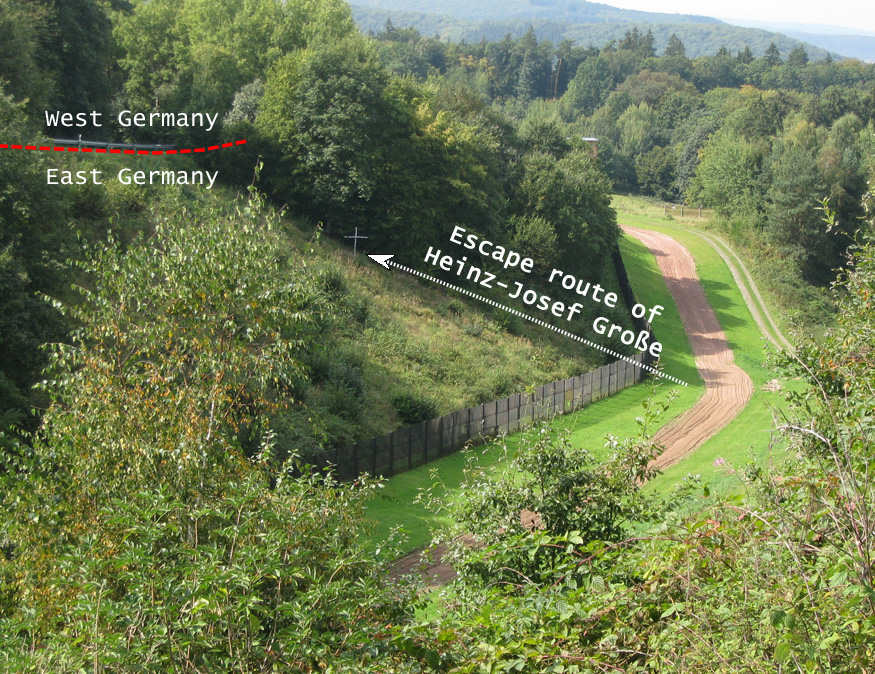
Heinz-Josef Große's escape route

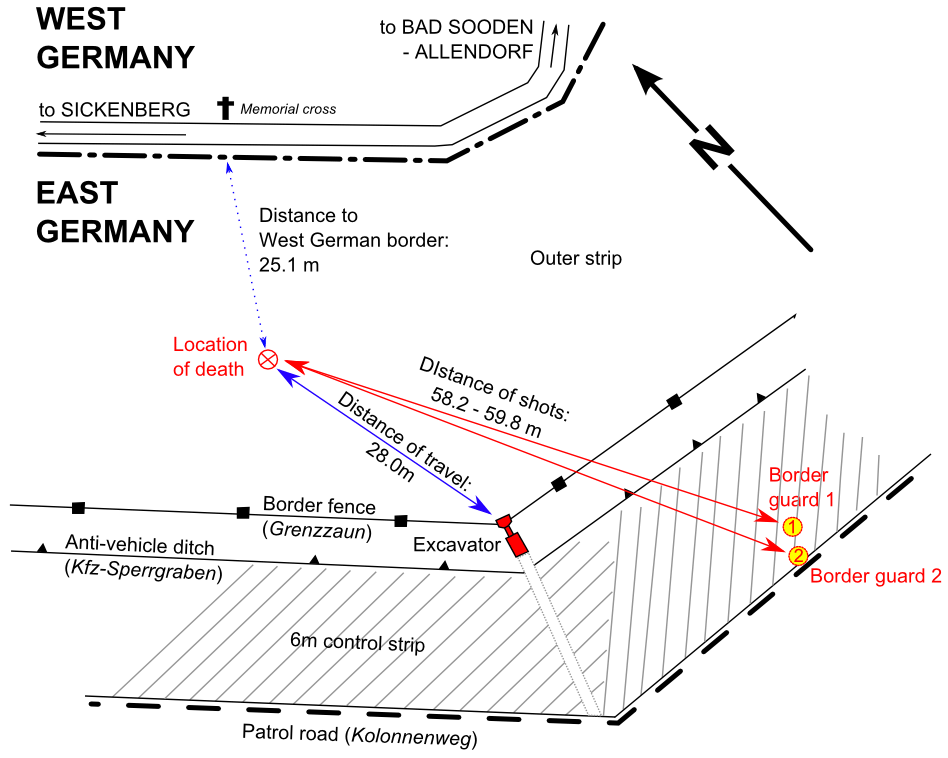
Schematic plan of the shooting of Heinz-Josef Große

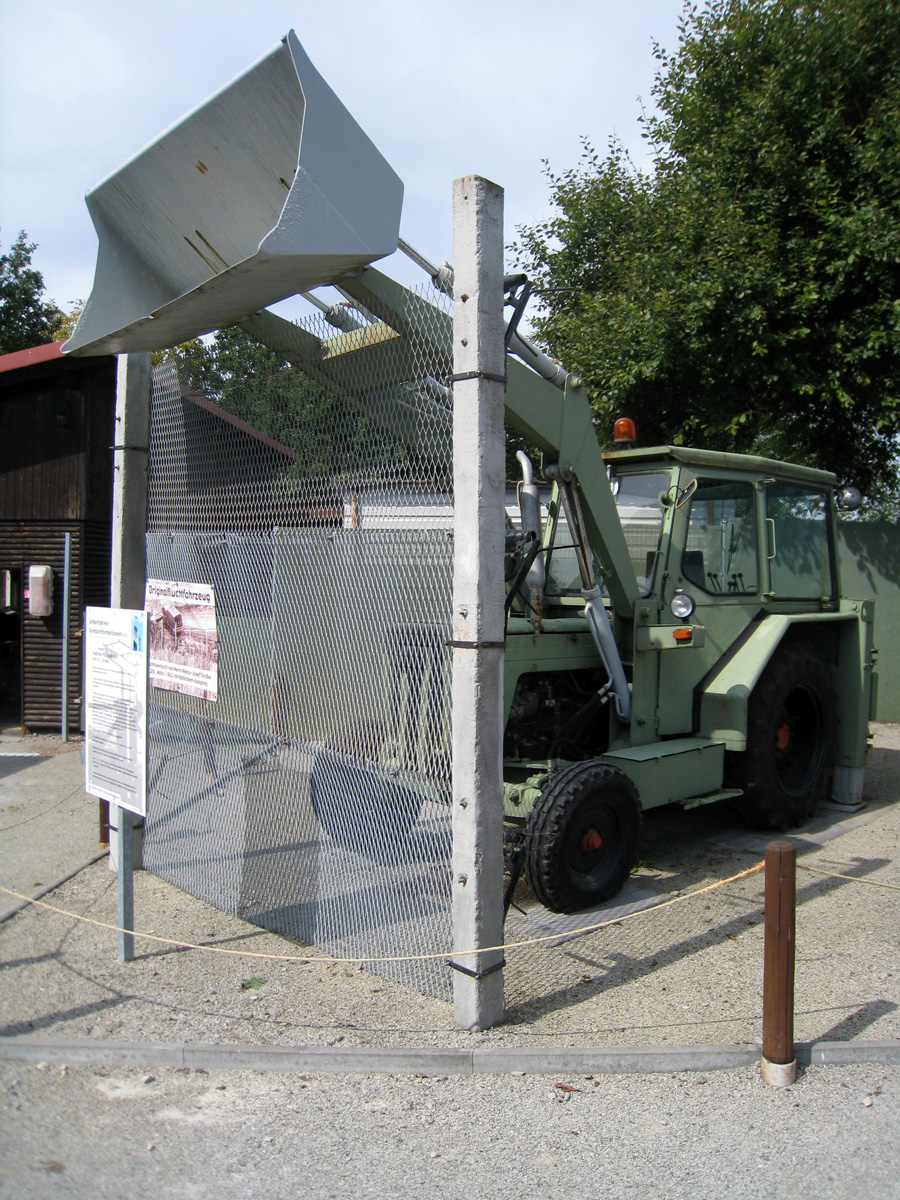
The backhoe loader used by Heinz-Josef Große

The incident provoked controversy in West Germany and condemnation of the GDR's "order to shoot" policy. A memorial cross was erected on the West German side of the border by local members of the (West German) Christian Democratic Union on 17 June 1982. It was inscribed with the slogan Einigkeit - Recht - Freiheit ("Unity - Justice - Freedom"). Thereafter, on each anniversary of the shooting, up to 2,000 people at a time demonstrated against the division of Germany at the point overlooking where Große was shot. The event was closely monitored by the GDR's security forces, who photographed the participants. It was not without controversy of its own; some in the West criticised the protest as mere rhetoric.

The two border guards who shot Große were put on trial in 1996 in the district court of Mühlhausen. Aged 20 and 23 at the time of the shooting, the two former guards were convicted of joint homicide and given suspended sentences of one year and three months.

Große is today commemorated by the original cross erected in 1982 as well as a memorial and explanatory display set up next to it. The memorial bears the inscription:

Du wurdest Opfer der Unfreiheit. / Dein Tod soll uns mahnen für die / Freiheit einzustehen und über sie zu wachen / Auf den Wege von Deutschland (Ost) nach Deutschland (West) / wurde am 29. März 1982 erschossen / Landsmann / Heinz-Josef Große / Thalwenden (Eichsfeld) You have been [a] victim of servitude. / Your death will remind us to stand up for / Liberty and watch over it / On the way from Germany (East) to Germany (West) / on 29 March 1982 [was] shot / Compatriot / Heinz-Josef Große / [of] Thalwenden (Eichsfeld)

Following the fall of the GDR in 1989, a second wooden memorial cross was set up on the spot where Große died, just inside what was East German territory. The nearby Grenzmuseum Schifflersgrund preserves the border fortifications for several hundred metres along the stretch where Große died, as well as the original backhoe loader that he used in his attempt to cross the border. The preserved border fence still retains the bullet holes caused by the burst of gunfire that killed Große.
