= Schießbefehl =

Use of lethal force to prevent defection from East Germany

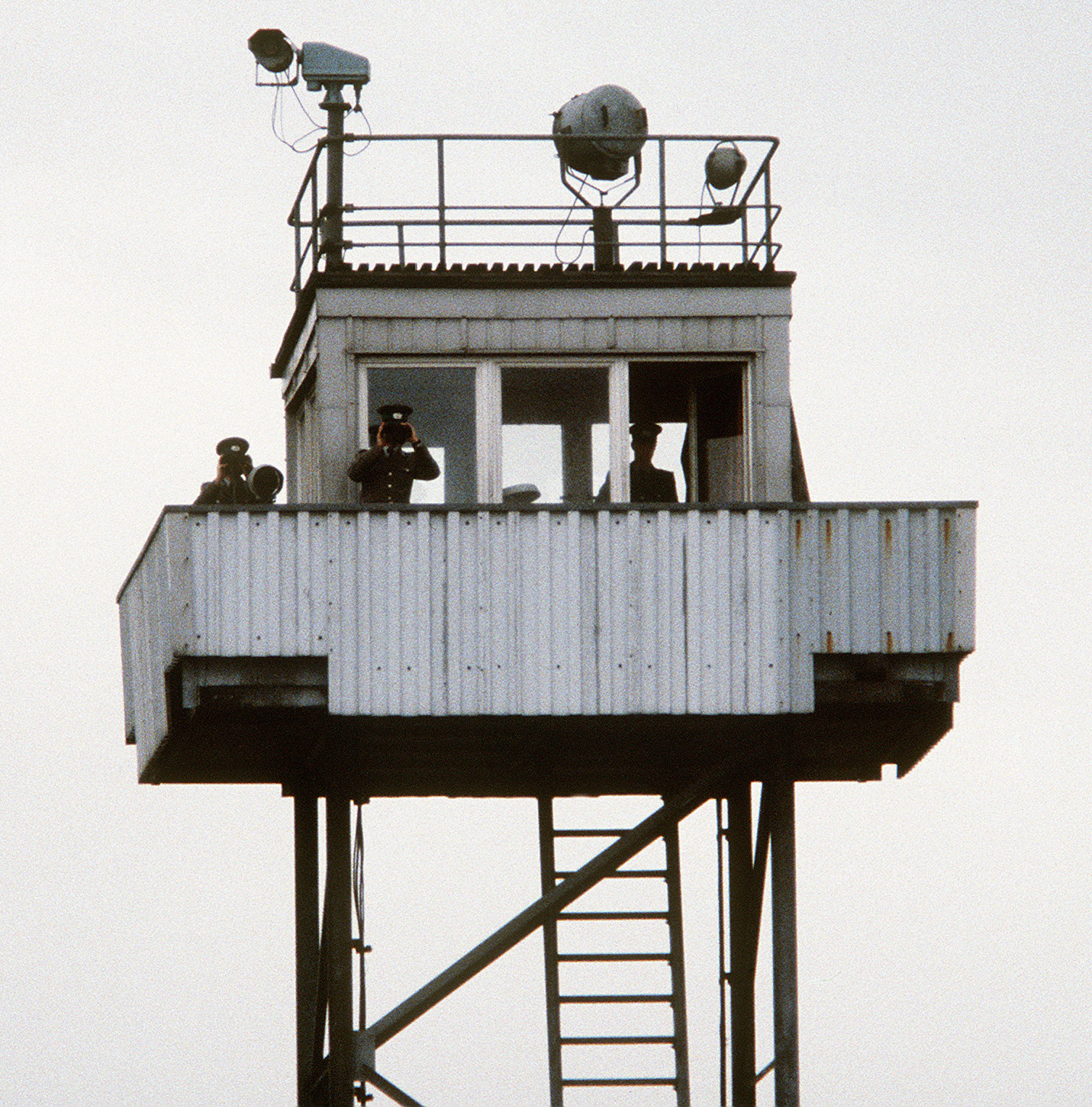
Three Border Troops guards in a watch tower on the Inner German border in 1984

Schießbefehl (German pronunciation: [ˈʃiːsbəˌfeːl]; German for "order to fire", lit. 'shoot order') was the term in the German Democratic Republic (East Germany) for standing orders authorizing the use of lethal force by the Border Troops to prevent Republikflucht (defection) at the Inner German border from 1960 to 1989.

Schießbefehl recommended guards use firearms to stop unauthorised border crossings in the direction of West Germany and procedure to conceal incidents from the public. Various Schießbefehl orders were issued, and their instructions to prevent East Germans leaving were not officially legal until 1982 and in violation of Article 13 of the Universal Declaration of Human Rights. An estimated 300 to 400 people died at the Inner German border during its existence. After German reunification in 1990, East German leader Erich Honecker was indicted by the Berlin District Court on charges of mass murder stemming from the Schießbefehl orders. However, his failing health and legal disputes over jurisdiction led his trial to be abandoned.

== Prescribed procedure ==
The Border Troops of the German Democratic Republic (Grenztruppen der DDR) were the border guards of the German Democratic Republic (East Germany) and until October 1949 of the Soviet Zone of Occupation, tasked with preventing the mass outward migration of East Germans to the West known as Republikflucht. The issue was a major political concern for the East German government, as the idea that any citizen of communist East Germany would voluntarily defect to the capitalist West was a source of ideological embarrassment, and preventing such defections was a longstanding objective. Originally the Border Troops were not formally integrated into the regular armed forces, the National People's Army (NVA), but typically carried military-level small arms such as Kalashnikov assault rifles or SKS semiautomatic carbines. From 1945, Soviet and East German border guards were given standing orders commonly referred to as Schießbefehl ("order to fire") that instructed them to follow certain rules of engagement when encountering persons moving illegally within the border strip:

- First, to call out "Halt, stehenbleiben, oder ich schieße!" ("Stop, stand still or I will shoot").
- Next, to fire a warning shot.
- Finally, if the fugitive failed to comply, to fire an aimed shot, preferably at the legs, to stop the person.

The Border Troops were told to avoid shooting in the direction of the territory of West Berlin and West Germany.

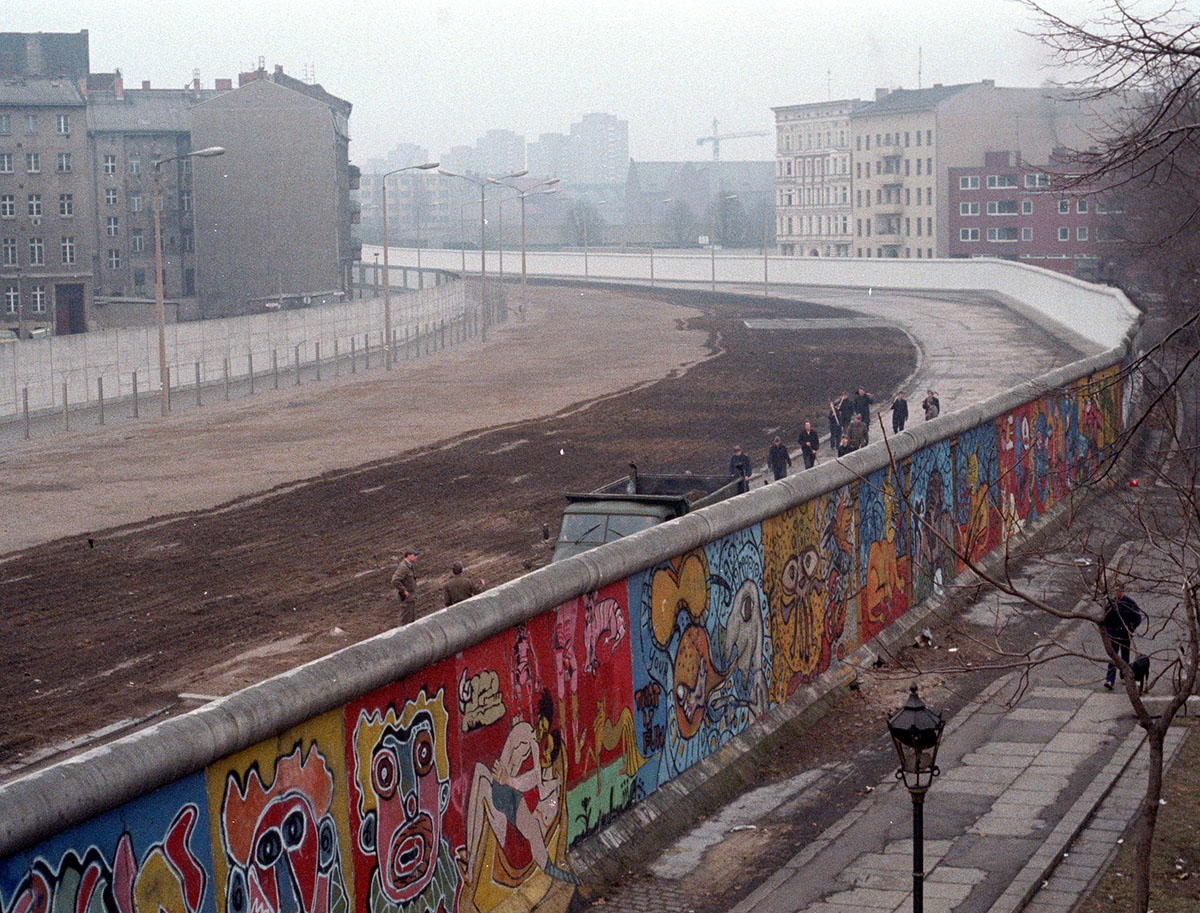
View of the Berlin Wall from West Berlin in 1986, showing the "death strip" built on the former Luisenstadt Canal in Kreuzberg

All occurrences at border outposts were kept secret from the general public, with each attempted or successful escape followed by a formal investigation by the military prosecution authority and the Ministry for State Security (Stasi). After stopping a potential escape attempt, the shooter would be granted a special leave and rewarded with commendations and cash bonuses. Often the shooter would be transferred to another military unit and ordered to keep silent. By contrast, when a fugitive was successful and crossed the border into West Germany, disciplinary measures were taken against those border guards who had failed to prevent this "Grenzverletzung und Republikflucht" (border violation and desertion from the Republic), which often included prison terms in the infamous military prison at Schwedt. Many border guards tried to let fugitives escape while deflecting such accusations by deliberately shooting off-target. When would-be escapees were killed, strict regulations were imposed on the family regarding the funeral; for instance, no obituaries were to be printed in the local newspapers. To avoid negative press, the Schießbefehl was suspended for public holidays or state visits.

In 1968, the Einsatzkompanie was founded as a special unit of the Stasi dedicated to preventing the defection of guards from the Border Troops.

== At the Berlin Wall ==
East Germany began to tighten its emigration laws during the 1950s, creating increasingly strict criteria for legal migration to non-Warsaw Pact countries, including requirements for de-registration with East German authorities and permission to leave the country under threat of prison sentences up to three years. The construction of the Berlin Wall on 13 August 1961 saw the effective illegalization of Republikflucht, with the law only allowing legal border crossings at so-called Grenzübergangsstellen ("checkpoints"), and requests for migration received very limited approval from authorities. Checkpoint Charlie was special, since this was one of the few border crossing points in Berlin where foreigners could enter East Berlin. Elsewhere, warning signs were posted telling people not to enter the border zone, known as "death strips", and any violation was considered a criminal act.

After construction of the Berlin Wall, with authorized travel by East Germans into West Germany and West Berlin incredibly difficult, the number of migrants dropped sharply from hundreds of thousands to only several hundred per year. The new migration system particularly discriminated against young East Germans, leading many to become motivated to attempt a desperate flight over the Inner German border despite the dangers.

== Deaths ==
On 6 February 1989, Schießbefehl was formally abolished. Overall, an official total of about 260 people were killed attempting to cross at the Berlin Wall, at the main East-West border, or via the Baltic Sea. The exact number of fatalities is difficult to estimate (see Inner German border deaths) and an unknown number were seriously wounded and later arrested. Victims of this system also include border guards who were shot by fugitives and their supporters. In Berlin alone, 190 people were killed in the course of 28 years. The last-known person to have been shot at the Wall was Chris Gueffroy, while the very last victim of the Wall was Winfried Freudenberg, dead by falling from an improvised hot air balloon.

Schießbefehl occurrences at the border were also recorded by the Bundesgrenzschutz (BGS or Federal Border Guard, the West German border guards), the West Berlin police, and by the military police of the Allied Forces. Files were collected in the central registration office at Salzgitter.

== Reunification ==
After German reunification in October 1990, the Todesschützen ("death shooters": soldiers who allegedly killed those attempting to escape East Germany) were brought to trial in the federal courts in what were known as the Mauerschützen-Prozesse ("Wall shooters trials"). Also, high-ranking officers of the Border Troops and the East German National Defense Council were charged in court. The verdicts generally agreed that even the common soldier should have and must have recognised that the East German border laws were so fundamentally in conflict with the International Covenant on Civil and Political Rights, which East Germany had signed and ratified, that they were not law at all but formalized injustice, and thus the soldiers ought to have disobeyed their commanding officers.

== See also ==
- Postenpflicht
- Police brutality
- Border violence as a crime against humanity
