= Commandant's Service (East Germany) =

Former East German Military Police

The Kommandantendienst (KD, English: Commandant Service), or later Militärstreife (English: Military patrol) was a special duty of the National People's Army of the GDR.

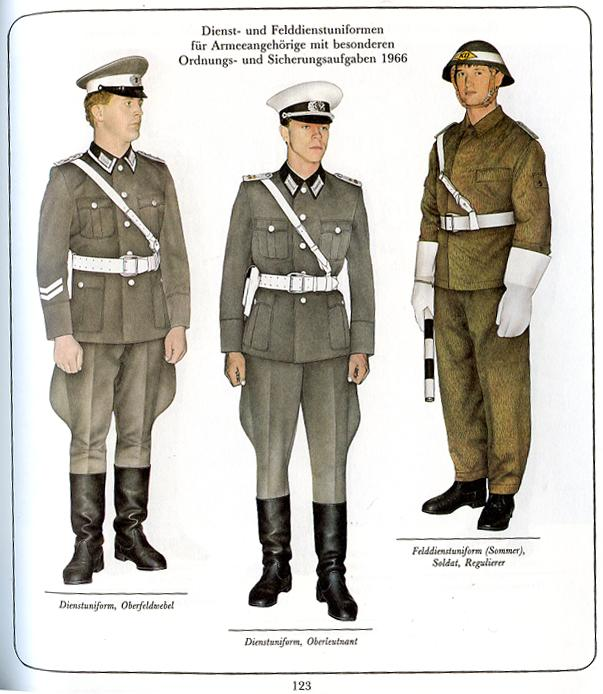
Illustration of Kommandantendienst uniforms. 1966

These units did not exist as separate units or as special units within certain troops. The Kommandantendienst was formed similar to units performing guard duties, where individuals were selected from existing officers and enlisted ranks. The tasks of the units comprised mainly the same functions that are undertaken by the Feldjäger (military police) of the Bundeswehr today, so among other things marches accompanied by military columns, the military security service, guard duties in the military prisons, and courier services.

The duty in the Kommandantendienst was usually scheduled for 24 hours and in exceptional cases for 48 hours (covering weekends). The special position (rights and duties) as a military policeman was indicated for members of the Kommandantendienst by wearing white colored coupling material (cross strap and belt, handgun holster, gloves) as well as a white stripe on their helmet. This particular form of the formation of the military police from members of regular units was the consequence of the negative experiences and criminal behavior of the Wehrmacht's Feldgendarmerie in World War II.

== Bibliography ==
- Ulbrichts Soldaten: Die Nationale Volksarmee 1956 bis 1971 [Ulbricht's Soldiers: The National People's Army 1956 to 1971] (in German) (1 ed.). Rüdiger Wenzke. 2013. ISBN 978-3-86-15369-63.
- Ab nach Schwedt!: die Geschichte des DDR-Militärstrafvollzugs [Off to Schwedt!: the history of the GDR military penal system] (in German) (2 ed.). Rüdiger Wenzke. 2013. ISBN 978-3-86-15363-83.
