= Fug =

Fug or FUG may refer to:

== Military and transport ==
- D-442 FÚG, a Hungarian armoured car
- Fuyang Xiguan Airport, China (IATA:FUG)
- Funkgerät (FuG), Luftwaffe radio equipment (Funkgerät) of World War II

== Other uses ==
- Gaúcho United Front, a defunct political coalition in Brazil (Portuguese: Frente Única Gaúcha)
- Fug, a minced oath in Norman Mailer's 1948 novel The Naked and the Dead

== People with the surname ==
- François Fug (born 1931), Luxembourgish former sports shooter

== See also ==
- The Fugs, an American band
