= Border Troops of the German Democratic Republic =

- Grenztruppen der DDR
- Active: 1 December 1946 – September 1990
- Country: East Germany
- Branch: Ministry of National Defense (1961–1990): Nationale Volksarmee (1961–1971) Ministry of the Interior (1946–1952, 1953–1961) Ministry for State Security (1952–1953)
- Size: 47,000
- Garrison/HQ: Bestensee-Pätz
- March: Die Grenzerkompanie

Commanders
- General Secretary of the SED and Chairman of the National Defense Council: Erich Honecker
- Deputy Minister of National Defence and Chief of the Border Troops: Klaus-Dieter Baumgarten

The Border Troops of the German Democratic Republic (German: Grenztruppen der DDR) was the border guard of the German Democratic Republic (GDR) from 1946 to 1990.

The Grenztruppen were the primary force guarding the Berlin Wall and the Inner German border, the GDR's international borders between West Berlin and West Germany respectively. The force belonged to the Ministry of National Defence (MfNV) from 1961, and was a service branch of the National People's Army until 1971 when it became directly subordinate to the MfNV. The Border Troops numbered approximately 47,000 personnel at its peak, consisting of volunteers and conscripts, the third-largest Warsaw Pact border guard after the Soviet Border Troops and Poland's Border Protection Troops.

The Grenztruppen's main role was preventing Republikflucht, the illegal migration from the GDR, and were controversially responsible for many deaths at the Berlin Wall.

== History ==
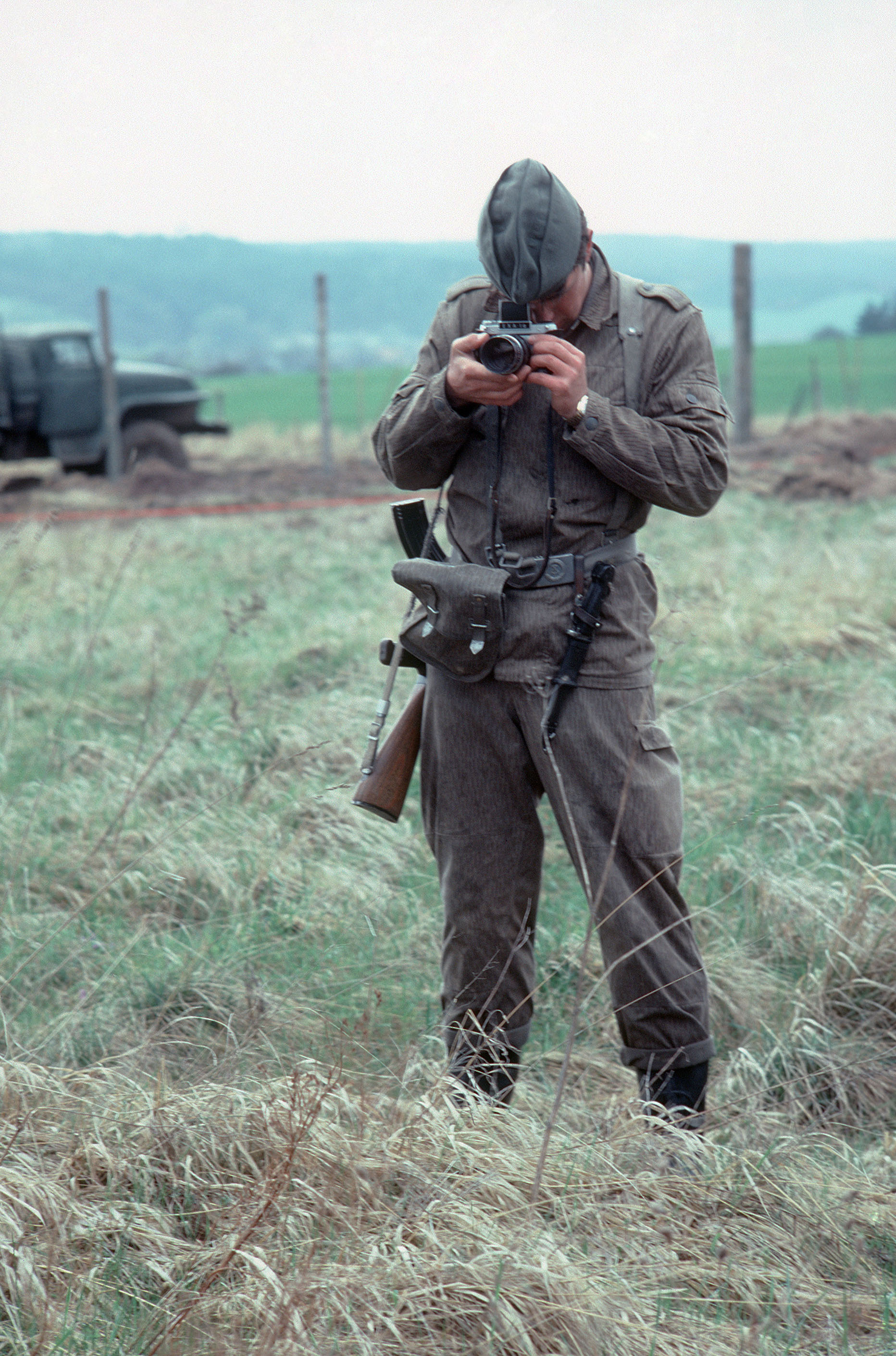
An East German Grenzaufklärungszug (GAK) border trooper taking pictures of US Army activities across the inner German border

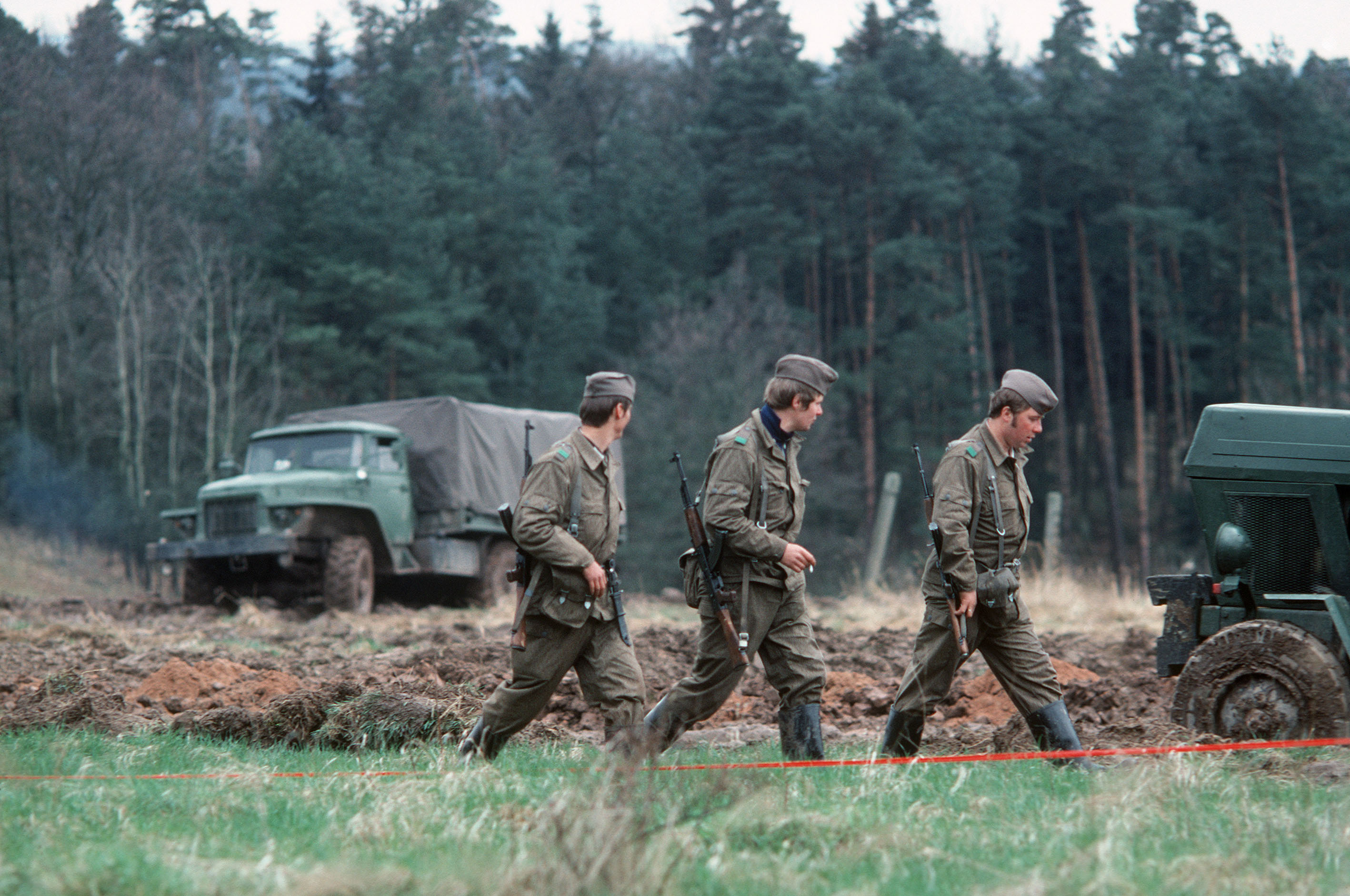
Grenztruppen guarding maintenance workers on the western side of the inner German border fence. The red tape in the foreground, the so-called "death cord", marked the area the work detail was permitted to operate, and workers stepping beyond the tape would be shot

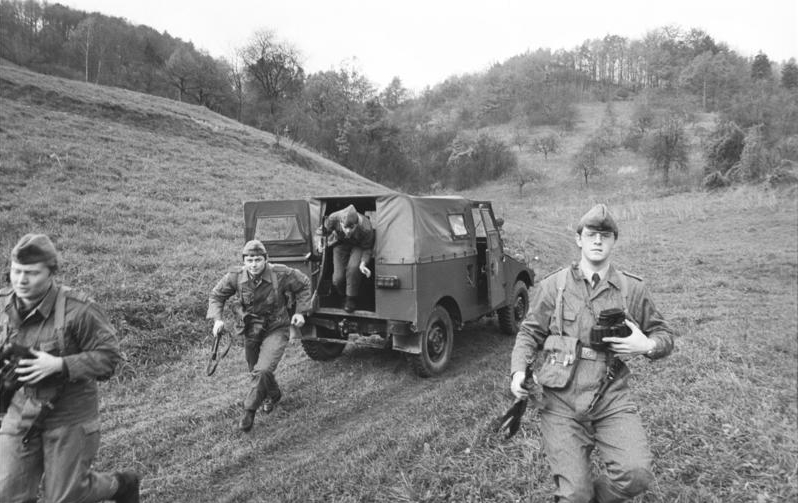
Grenztruppen during an exercise near Mühlhausen on March 27, 1982

By December 1945, within six months of the end of the Second World War, each of the five states in the Soviet Zone of Occupation had new police forces in clear violation of the Yalta and Potsdam agreements. In early January 1946, the name Volkspolizei (People's Police) was publicly applied to the new police forces in the Soviet Zone, and in August these forces were placed under the centralized control of the newly created German Administration of the Interior, headed by Erich Reschke. On 1 December 1946, the Deutsche Grenzpolizei (German Border Police) was organized by the Soviet Military Administration in Germany (SMAD) as a paramilitary to defend the borders of the Soviet Zone. The initial 3,000 recruits of the Grenzpolizei were organized and trained from Volkspolizei resources, and by April 1948 numbered 10,000 personnel before rising to 18,000 in 1950. The Grenzpolizei were armed and organized like a police force, and were subordinate to the Main Administration of the Border Police and Alert Units of the German Administration of the Interior. The Soviet Zone was formed into the German Democratic Republic (GDR or East Germany) in October 1949 and led by the Socialist Unity Party of Germany (SED) under Soviet influence. The SED reorganized the Grenzpolizei along military lines, similar to the USSR's Border Troops, and briefly transferred them from the Ministry of the Interior (Ministerium des Innern) to the Ministry of State Security (MfS or Stasi) from May 1952 to June 1953.

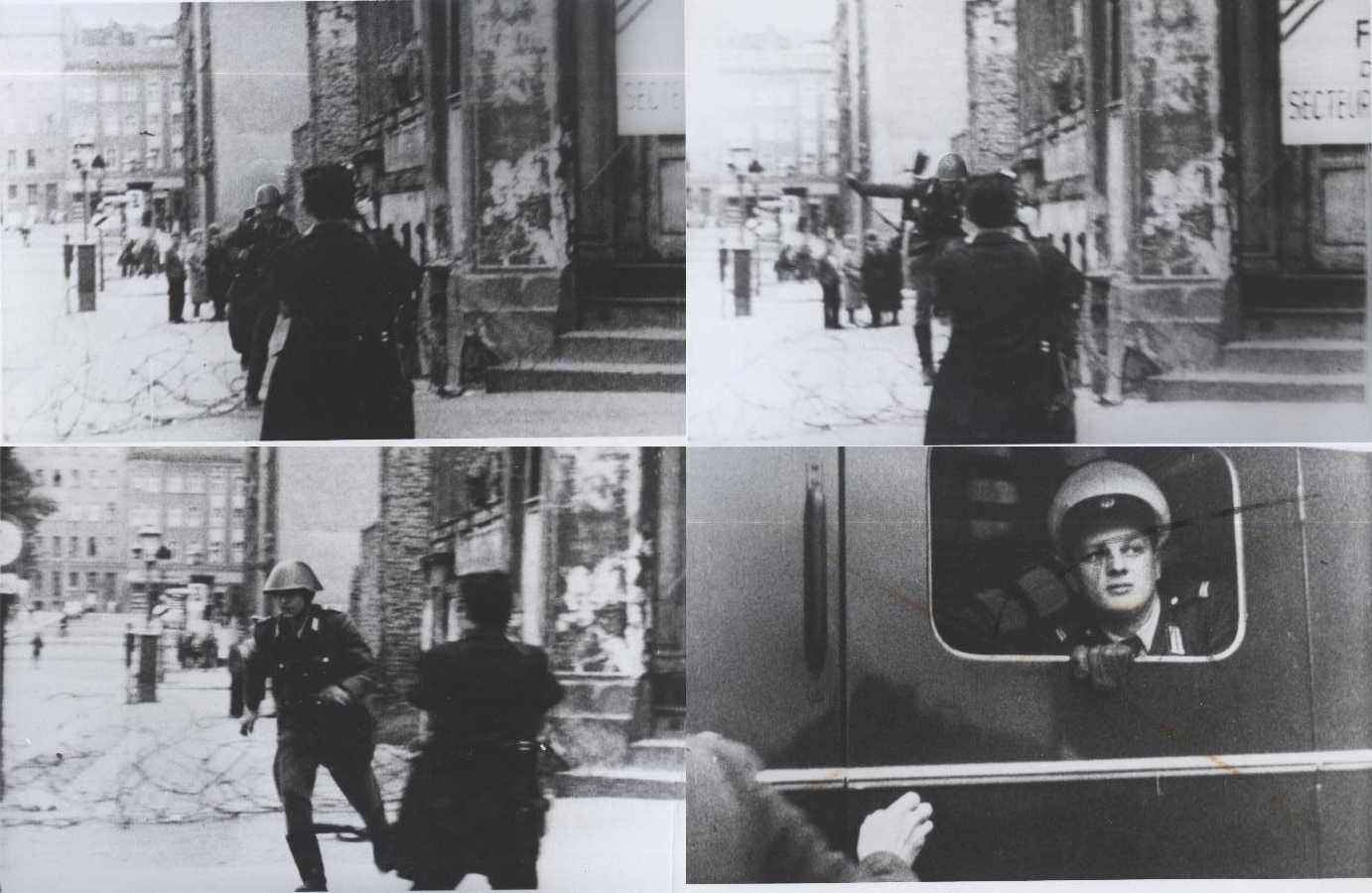
East German border guard Konrad Schumann fleeing East Germany, 1961

In 1961, the Grenzpolizei were reorganized as the Border Troops of the GDR (Grenztruppen der DDR) and were moved from the Ministry of the Interior, which oversaw policing, to the Ministry of National Defence (MfNV) which oversaw the military. The Grenztruppen became the fourth service branch of the National People's Army (NVA), the armed forces of the GDR. In 1973 they were separated and became directly subordinate to the MfNV, on grounds of not to be counted in MBFR. While wearing standard NVA uniforms, the Grenztruppen had their own dark green arm-of-service colour, and their service and dress uniforms bore a green cuff title with white lettering "Grenztruppen der DDR" on the left arm. The vast majority of Grenztruppen efforts were directed along the GDR's western borders with West Germany and West Berlin, with only about 600 members assigned to guard the GDR's borders with Poland and Czechoslovakia. This continued until the 1980s when the rise of the Solidarity trade union in Poland saw the GDR considerably toughen the Grenztruppen's presence along their border.

On 1 July 1990, the GDR's border control regime along the borders with West Germany and West Berlin was ended. In September 1990, shortly before the reunification of Germany, the Grenztruppen were disbanded; its border patrol duties along united Germany's eastern frontiers were assumed by the Bundesgrenzschutz (Federal Border Guard – later the Bundespolizei or Federal Police).

== Pass and control units ==
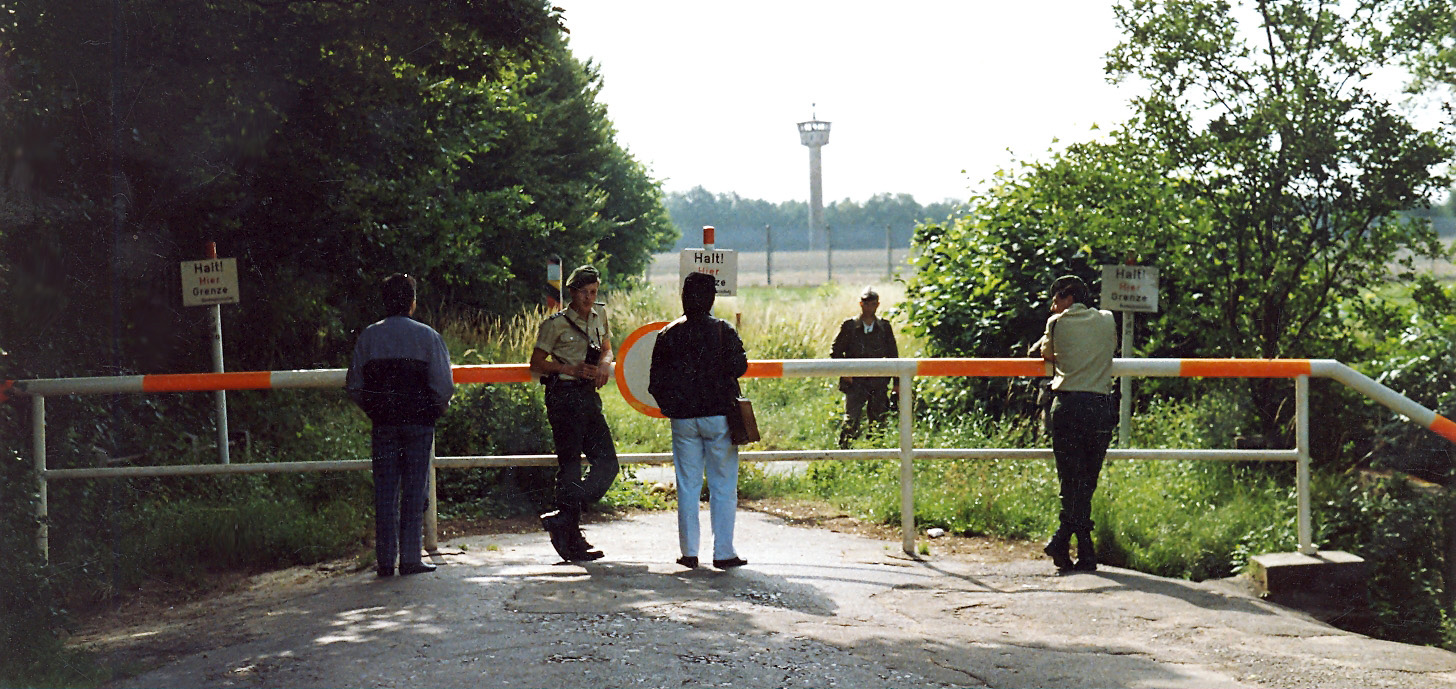
West German border personnel, civilians and an East German border guard on opposite sides of the border line at Herrnburg near Lübeck

For most visitors to East Berlin and the GDR, including persons who utilized the land transit routes (road and rail) between West Germany and West Berlin, their exposure to the Grenztruppen der DDR consisted of dealing with the members of the Pass and Control Units (Paß- und Kontrolleinheiten, PKE) who processed travelers passing through the GDR's Grenzübergangsstellen (border crossing points). Although they wore Grenztruppen uniforms, the members of the PKE were in fact members of the 6th Main Department (Hauptabteilung VI) of the Stasi.

== Organizational structure ==
The headquarters of the Grenztruppen der DDR was located at Bestensee-Pätz (a small village southeast of Berlin in the present-day state of Brandenburg), near Königs Wusterhausen.

The Grenzkommando Nord (GKN) [Border Command North], with headquarters at Stendal (in the present-day state of Saxony-Anhalt) was responsible for the northern sector of the East German border. The GKN consisted of five frontier troops regiments, two training regiments, a helicopter flight and some smaller support units. The Grenzregiment 25 "Neithardt von Gneisenau" was disbanded in August 1983 and its units dispersed among the other border regiments of the command.

The Grenzkommando Süd (GKS) [Border Command South], with headquarters at Erfurt, guarded the southern border sector. The organizational structure of the GKS was similar to that of the GKN, with six frontier troops regiments, two training regiments, a helicopter flight and some smaller support units.

The Grenzkommando Mitte (GKM) [Border Command Center], with headquarters at Berlin-Karlshorst, manned the crossing points into West Berlin and guarded the entire border perimeter surrounding West Berlin. The GKM consisted of six frontier troops regiments, two training regiments and some smaller support units. Unlike the Border Commands North and South, which fielded border regimens in full-sized border battalions, the border regiments of the Border Command Center were of reduced strength. They had the same complement of combat support and combat service support units, but the border guards were organized in companies directly subordinated to the regiments. A Border-crossing Security Regiment (the GÜST Sicherungsregiment SiR-26 "Walter Husemann") was disbanded in 1985 and its forces dispersed among the border regiments, as the centralized location made the deployment of security details through the city to the various border crossings around West Berlin difficult. An artillery regiment (the Artillerieregiment AR-26 "Otto Nelte") was formed on March 17, 1971, with the mission to provide artillery support in case a war erupts and the GDR launches an offensive operation to capture West Berlin. It was put under Border Troops command to circumvent the restrictions for military forces in both parts of Berlin and was a source of constant tension between the GDR and its Soviet ally on one hand and West Germany and its western allies on the other. In the final years of its existence the German Democratic Republic sought warming up of its relationship with the Federal Republic of Germany and as one of the signs of goodwill the regiment was transferred to the Land Forces of the National People's Army on November 1, 1985 (becoming the Artillerieregiment-40) and directly subordinated to the Chief of Artillery and Rocket Forces.

The Border Brigade to the Czechoslovak People's Republic "Walter Breit" (Grenzbrigade zur CSSR "Walter Breit" (GBr CSSR)) with headquarters at Pirna was responsible for the security of the border with Czechoslovakia. It consisted of six battalion-sized units called Border Subsections (Grenzunterabschnitt).

The Border Brigade to the Polish People's Republic "Hermann Gartmann" (Grenzbrigade zur VR Polen "Hermann Gartmann" (GBr VRP)) with headquarters at covered the Polish border. It consisted of six battalion-sized units called Border Subsections (Grenzunterabschnitt).

The security of the Baltic coast was within the responsibilities of the Volksmarine. For that reason the 6th Border Brigade Coast "Fiete Schulze" (6. Grenzbrigade Küste "Fiete Schulze", headquartered in Rostock), while administratively part of the Border Troops was operationally subordinated to the naval headquarters at Rostock. The Naval Command had an integral staff division, tasked with the command-and-control of the brigade. The 6th Border Brigade Coast consisted of twelve marine battalions and several boat battalions and companies to guard the GDR's relatively small coastline along the Baltic Sea.

=== Reorganization in 1989 ===
In accordance with a June 1989 decision of the National Defence Council of the GDR, the Grenztruppen der DDR were extensively reorganized, as of 30 November 1989. The personnel strength was reduced by approximately 17%, while the number of headquarters units was reduced from 50 to 24.

In the place of the previous command structure, six border district commands (Grenzbezirkskommandos), 16 border county commands (Grenzkreiskommandos) and two border training centers (Grenzausbildungszentren) were created. The Grenzbezirkskommandos reported to the national headquarters.

== Subordination of the Deutsche Grenzpolizei (1948–1961) ==
13 Jul 1948-11 Oct 1949: Controlled by the DVdI

12 Oct 1949–1952: Controlled by the MdI

1952-16 Jun 1953: Controlled by the MfS

17 June 1953 – 1955: Controlled by the MdI

1955-28 Feb 1957: Controlled by the MfS

1 Mar 1957-14 Sep 1961: Controlled by the MdI

Sep 1961 -1973: Controlled by the NVA, the Grenzpolizei were reorganized as the Kommando der Grenztruppen (KdoGT) der NVA and were moved from the GDR MdI to the GDR Ministry of National Defence (MfNV).

1973 – 1990: Controlled directly by the MfNV. Renamed the Grenztruppen der DDR

1990 – 1994: Controlled by the Bundeswehr. The border guards' numbers were rapidly reduced. Half were dismissed within five months of the opening of the border. The border was abandoned and the Grenztruppen were officially abolished on 1 July 1990; all but 2,000 of them were dismissed or transferred to other jobs. The Bundeswehr gave the remaining border guards and other ex-NVA soldiers the task of clearing the border fortifications, which was only completed in 1994. The scale of the task was immense, as not only did the fortifications have to be cleared but hundreds of roads and railway lines had to be rebuilt.

== Training and equipment ==
Training for Grenztruppen soldiers was provided by the four training regiments; after the reorganization of 30 November 1989 (see below), the four regiments were consolidated into two training centers. Training for noncommissioned officers was held at the Unteroffiziersschule der Grenztruppen der DDR "Egon Schultz" in Perleberg. Training for dog handlers was conducted in Wilhelmshorst. Grenztruppen officers and officer candidates were trained at the Offiziershochschule der Grenztruppen der DDR "Rosa Luxemburg" in Suhl (previously located in Plauen).

Border Troop regiments were trained similar to regular infantry, but were much more lightly equipped than comparable NVA infantry formations, with the heaviest weapon being the RPG-7 grenade launcher. To increase their capability to search for persons attempting to flee the GDR, most units had German Shepherd dogs. A regiment consisted of around 1,500 men divided into three battalions of four companies each. These regiments also had an anti-tank battery, a mortar battery and an engineer company.

Units of the Grenzkommando Mitte were mechanised, with PSzH-IV and FUG armoured vehicles.

The firearms utilized were the Makarov PM as the standard sidearm, MPi-K Rifle (an East German copy of the AK-47), RPK and RPD to name the most utilized weapons by the Grenztruppen. It has also been documented that the RPG-7 and PKM were also used in certain situations if needed.

=== Helicopters ===
- Mil Mi-2

=== Gallery ===
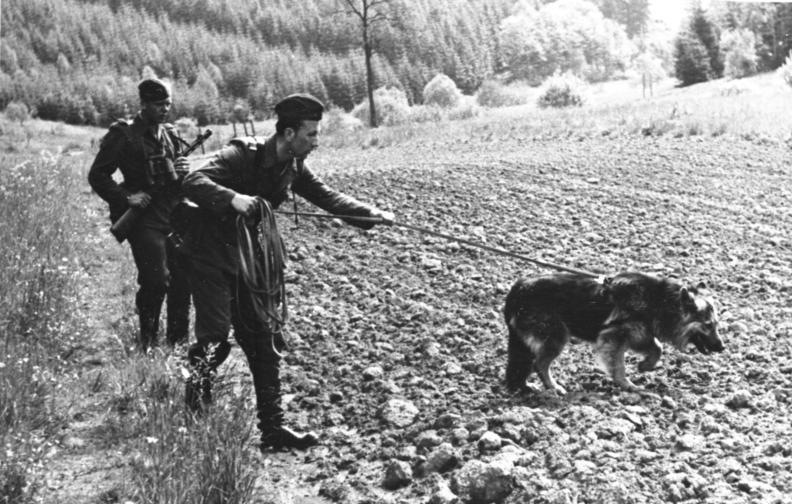
Grenztruppen with a German Shepherd service dog

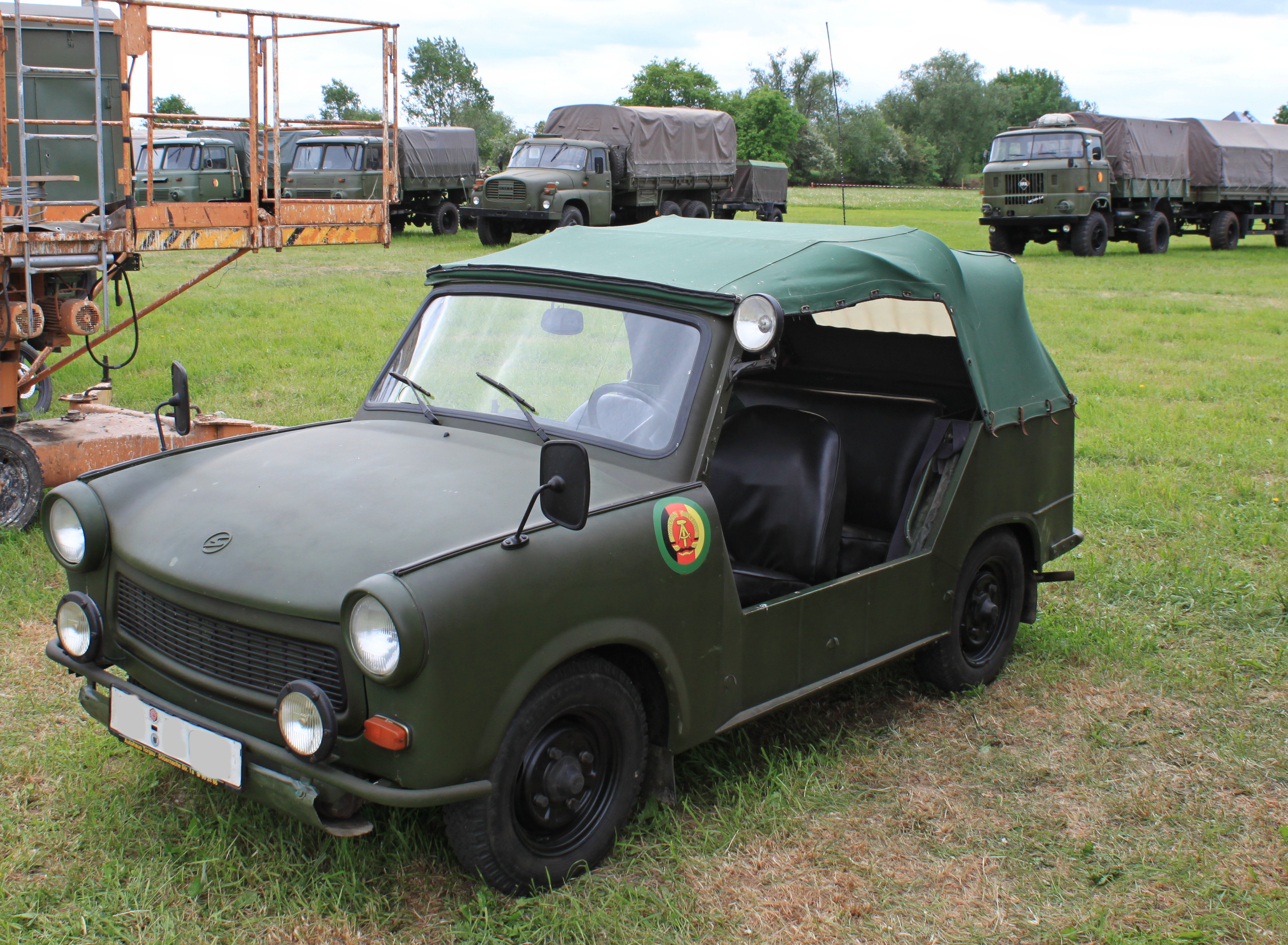
A Trabant field car

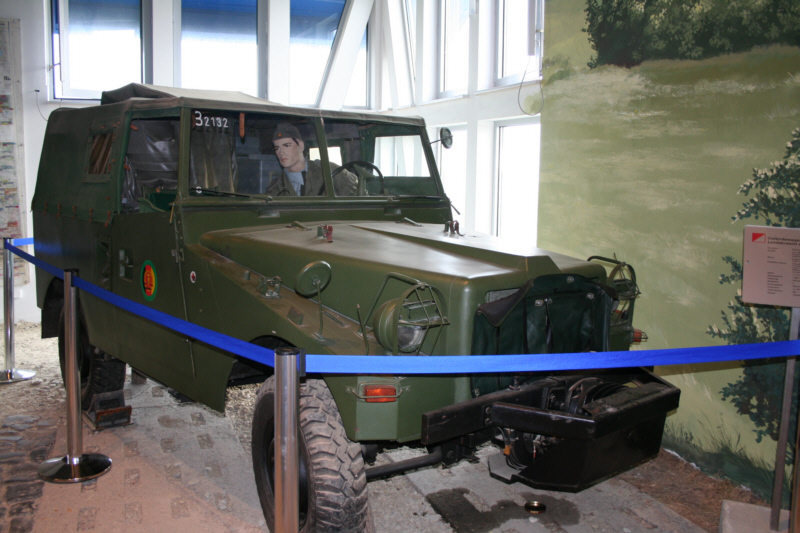
An IFA P3 field car

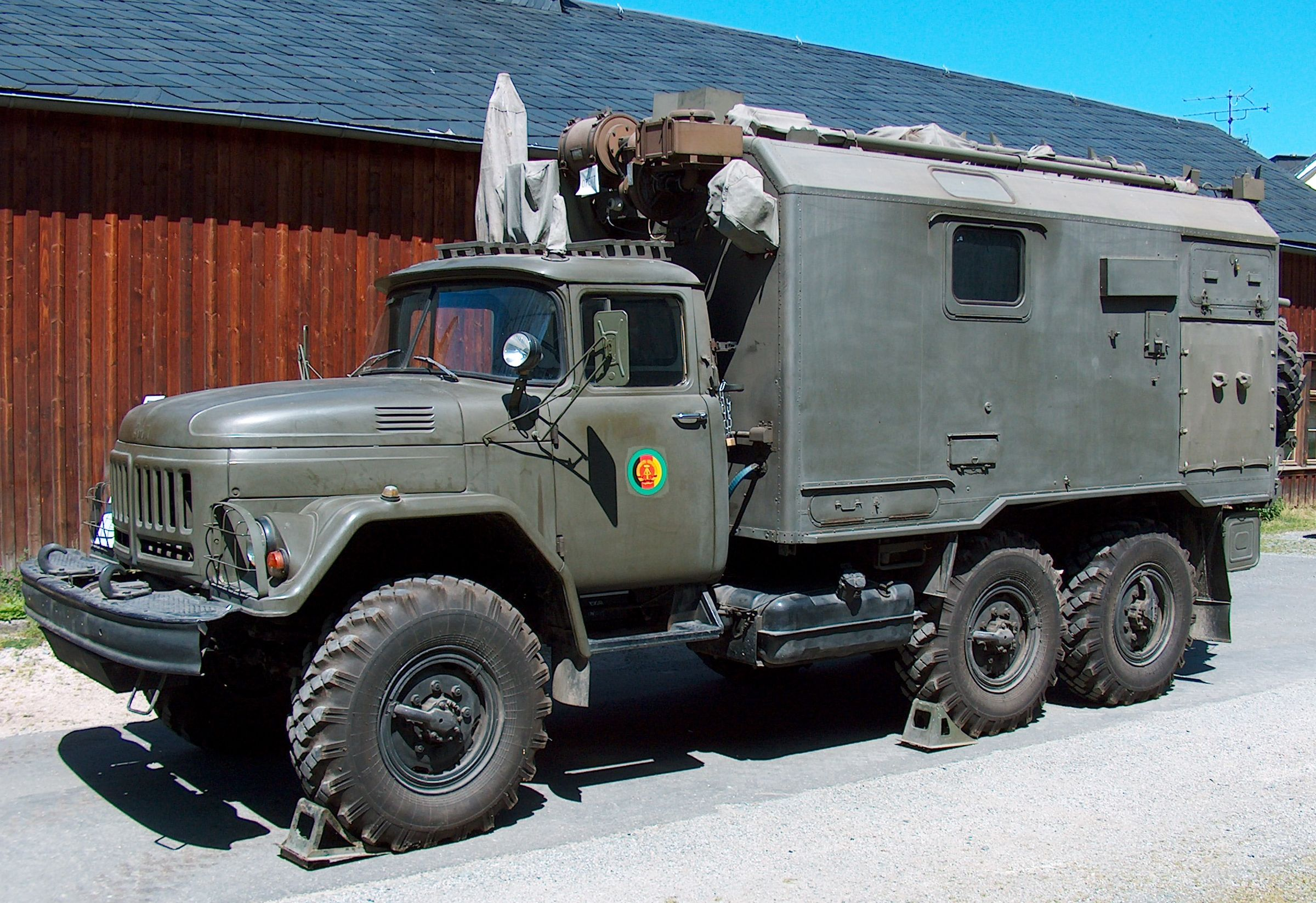
A Grenztruppen ZIL-131 with KUNG

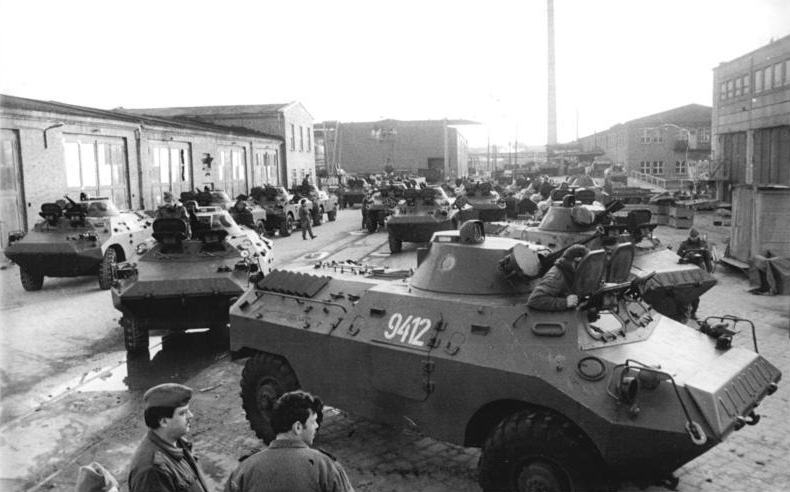
PSzH-IVs

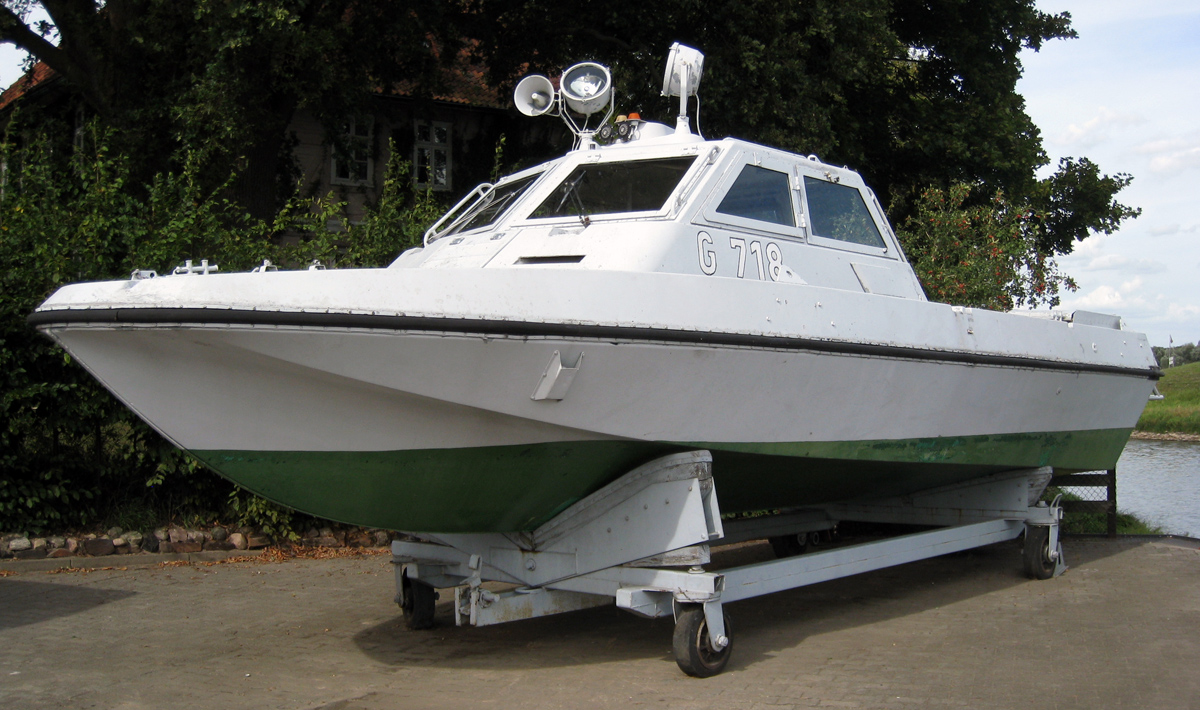
A Grenztruppen river patrol boat

== Refugee shootings along the Berlin Wall and the inner German border ==
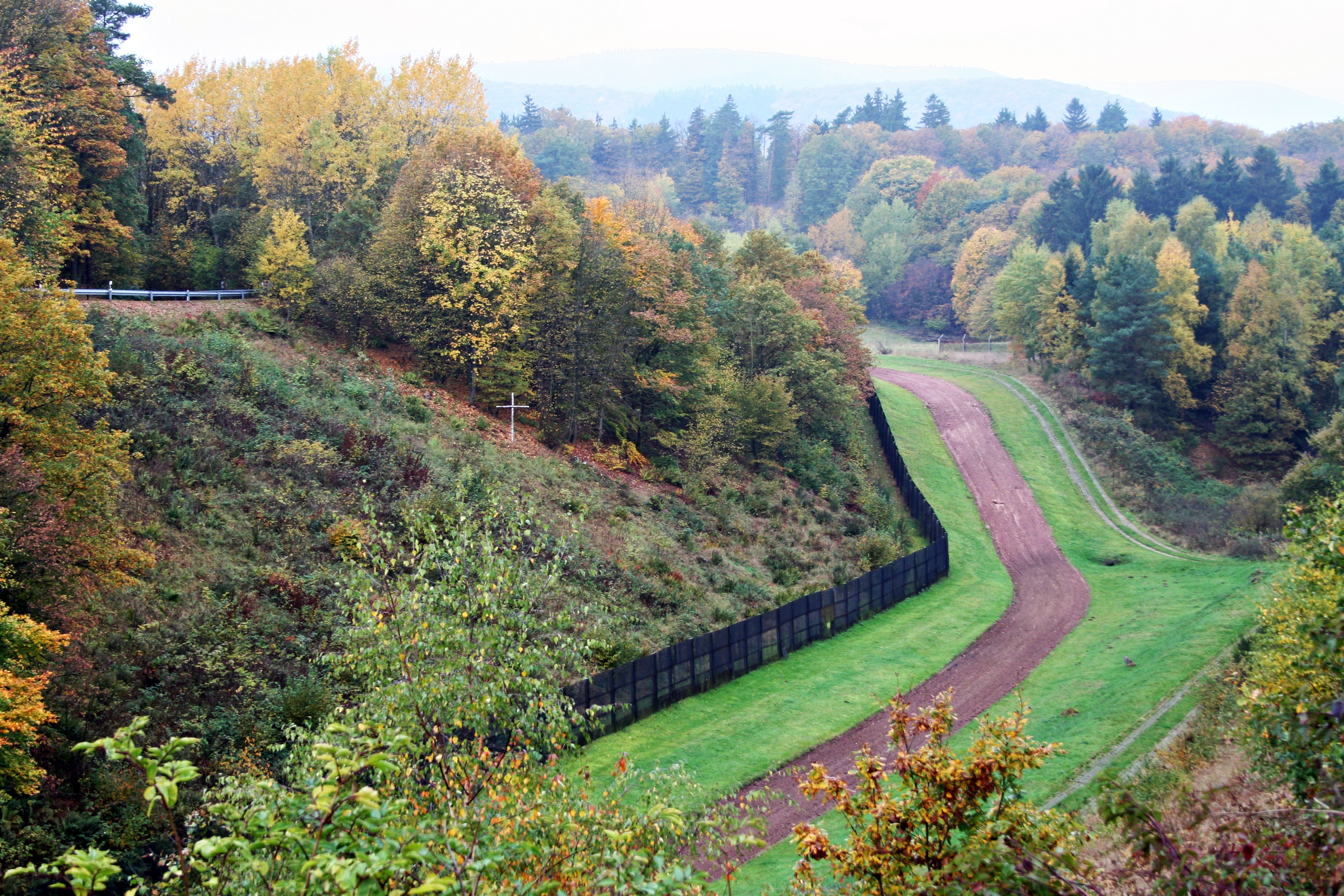
The inner German border between Thuringia and Hesse, taken in 2008 A.D. on a preserved part of the former border. The border fence can be seen with a mined control strip behind it and a lane patrol road; the actual boundary was located above the wooded slope. In the rear part of the open area on the wooded slope is a cross, which marks the place of death of the 34-year-old worker Heinz-Josef Große, who died on 29 March 1982, while attempting to escape.

Undoubtedly the most controversial aspect surrounding the Grenztruppen der DDR concerns those who were killed or wounded while attempting to flee East Germany into the West. Even today, the topic of the "shoot-to-kill order" (Schießbefehl) is quite sensitive in Germany, East and West. According to information released by the "Working Group 13th of August" (Arbeitsgemeinschaft 13. August e.V.) on 13 August 2004, 1,065 persons were killed along the GDR's frontiers and coastline, including 37 Grenztruppen soldiers killed during escape attempts. Many more were wounded.

The Berlin Public Prosecution Department estimates that about 270 'proven' deaths on the border were due to acts of violence by GDR border security guards, including deaths caused by mines and automatic firing devices. However, the Zentrale Ermittlungsstelle für Regierungs- und Vereinigungskriminalität (ZERV), which existed from 1991 to 2000 as a branch of the Berlin Police, registered 421 suspected cases of killings by armed GDR border guards.

== Line-of-duty deaths ==
29 Grenztruppen died in the line of duty. The first three deaths occurred at the time of the Soviet occupation zone, after the founding of the German Democratic Republic in October 1949 until its end of 1990 were a further 26 border policemen and border soldiers were killed. Of these 29, 20 died on the inner German border, eight at the Berlin Wall and one on the border with Czechoslovakia.

A 2017 study by the Free University of Berlin recorded 24 border guards being killed: nine were shot by people fleeing East Germany, eight in "friendly fire" incidents, three by civilians, three by US patrols and one by a West German border guard.

The list of names of the deceased are below. Only occasional light on the cause of death and killers if known is shed.

- Paul Sager († 10. November 1948)
- Gerhard Hofert († 3. August 1949)
- Fritz Otto († 1. September 1949)
- Siegfried Apportin († 2. July 1950)
- Herbert Liebs († 21 February 1951)
- Werner Schmidt († 2 March 1951)
- Heinz Janello († 2 March 1951)
- Rudolf Spranger († 7 August 1951)
- Manfred Portwich († 27 October 1951)
- Ulrich Krohn († 16 May 1952)
- Helmut Just († 30 December 1952)
- Waldemar Estel († 3 September 1956)
- Jörgen Schmidtchen († 18 April 1962; army deserter shot dead by two cadets from the flak school at Stahnsdorf)
- Manfred Weiß († 19 May 1962)
- Peter Göring († 23 May 1962)
- Reinhold Huhn († 18 June 1962)
- Rudi Arnstadt († 14 August 1962)
- Günter Seling († 30 September 1962)
- Siegfried Widera († 8 September 1963; fatally injured by refugees on August 23, 1963)
- unknown Volkspolizei member († 15 September 1964)
- Egon Schultz († 5 October 1964)
- Hans-Adolf Scharf († 10 June 1966)
- Rolf Henniger († 15 November 1968)
- Lutz Meier († 18 January 1972)
- Klaus-Peter Seidel, and Jürgen Lange (both † 19 December 1975; both shot dead by deserting army soldier Werner Weinhold)
- Ulrich Steinhauer († 4 November 1980; a postal officer from his post deserter killed with a shot in the back. The offender managed to escape, he was convicted in West Berlin in 1981 for manslaughter in a youth custody of 6 years.)
- Klaus-Peter Braun († 1 August 1981)
- Eberhard Knospe († 5 May 1982)
- Uwe Dittmann († 22 March 1985)
- Horst Hnidyk († 3 August 1989)

== See also ==
- Grepo
- Crossing the inner German border
- Development of the inner German border
- Fortifications of the inner German border
- Escape attempts and victims of the inner German border
- Fall of the inner German border
- Bundesgrenzschutz, West Germany border guards
