= Republikflucht =

Defection from East Germany

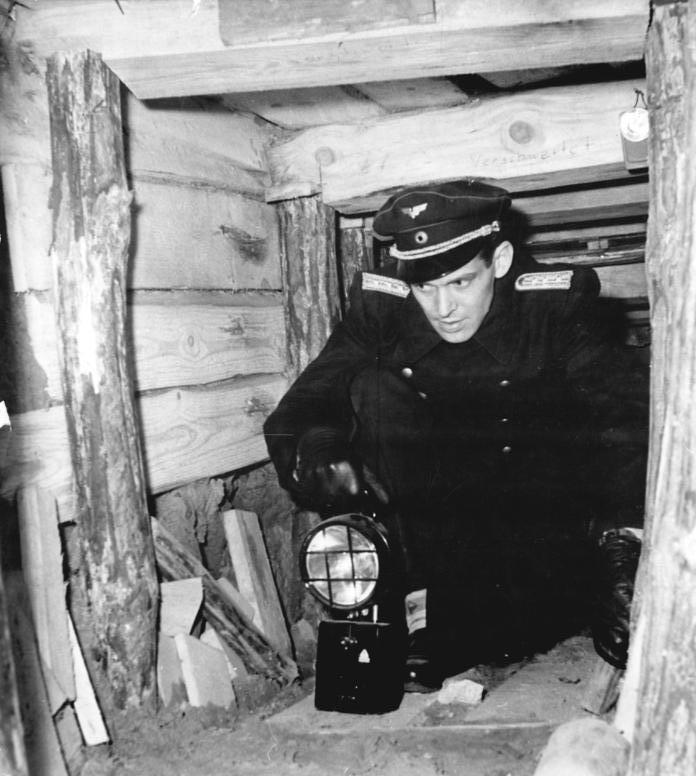
A Deutsche Reichsbahn official inspects the escape tunnel beneath Berlin Wollankstraße station in January 1962.

Movement (1977–1986)

Republikflucht ([ʁepuˈbliːkˌflʊxt]; German for "desertion from the republic", lit. 'republic flight') was the colloquial term in the German Democratic Republic (East Germany) for illegal emigration to the Federal Republic of Germany (West Germany), West Berlin, and non-Warsaw Pact countries. The official term was Ungesetzlicher Grenzübertritt ("unlawful border crossing"). Republikflucht applied to both the 3.5 million Germans who migrated legally from the Soviet occupation zone and East Germany before the Berlin Wall was built on 13 August 1961, and the thousands who migrated illegally across the Iron Curtain until 23 December 1989. It has been estimated that 30,000 people left the GDR per year between 1984 and 1988, and up to 300,000 per year before the construction of the Berlin Wall in 1961.

East German criminal law made Republikflucht punishable by heavy fines or imprisonment. In certain cases violators were subject to summary execution under the Schießbefehle authorising Border Troops to employ lethal force.

== Legislation ==
As of 28 June 1979, the wording of § 213 StGB was:

(1) Unlawfully crossing the border of the German Democratic Republic or violating legislation regarding temporary residence within the German Democratic Republic as well as transit through the German Democratic Republic is punished by imprisonment of up to two years or conviction on probation, imprisonment or a fine.

(2) Not returning in time, unlawfully returning to the German Democratic Republic or violating government conditions about staying abroad as a citizen of the German Democratic Republic is also punished.

(3) In severe cases, the perpetrator is punished by imprisonment of one or up to eight years. A severe case exists in particular, if:

1. the crime endangered life or health of humans;
2. the crime took place bearing weapons or under application of dangerous means or methods;
3. the crime was executed with increased intensity;
4. the crime took place by forgery of documents, false certification, abuse of documents, or by using a hideout;
5. the crime was executed together with others;
6. the perpetrator was convicted of illegal border crossing before.

(4) Preparation and attempt are punishable.

== History ==
=== Original legal emigration ===
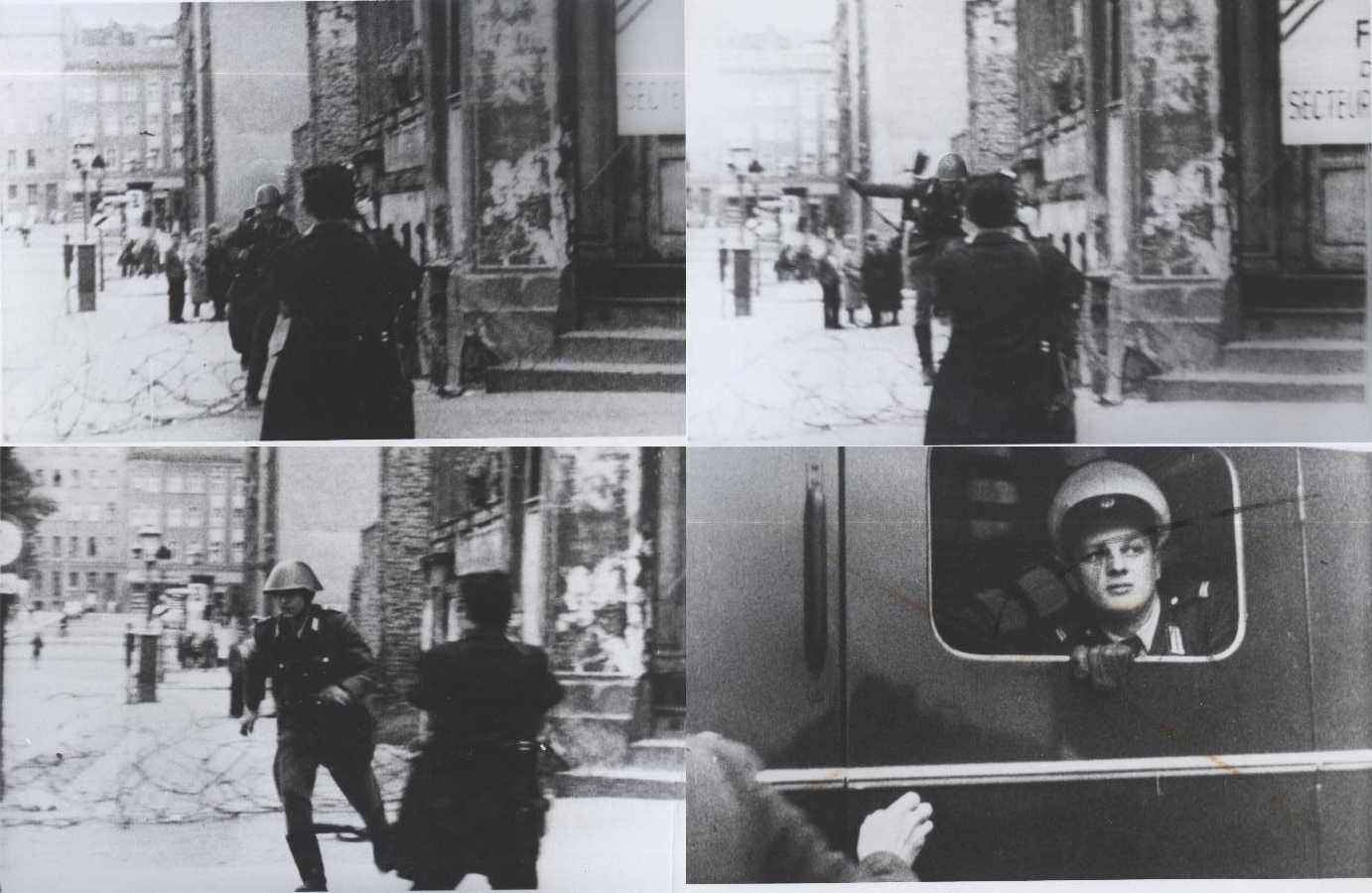
East German soldier Conrad Schumann deserts to West Berlin during construction of the Berlin Wall in 1961.

Republikflucht is a German term which translates to "desertion from the republic" or "flight from the republic" with migrants known as "Republikflüchtling(e)" ("deserter(s) from the republic"). The term was first used in 1945 almost immediately after World War II by officials in the Soviet Zone of Occupation, four years before the establishment of the German Democratic Republic (East Germany or GDR), in reference to the large number of Germans legally migrating westward to the American, British, and French zones of occupation. The establishment of the GDR in October 1949 saw the continued usage of the term by authorities to describe the process of, and the person(s), leaving for a life in West Germany and West Berlin, or any other Western or non-Warsaw Pact countries.

By the 1950s, the GDR began to tighten its emigration laws and stigmatize Republikflucht in an attempt to curtail legal emigration, including requiring de-registration with East German authorities and permission to leave the country under threat of prison sentences up to three years. A propaganda booklet published by the GDR's ruling Socialist Unity Party of Germany (SED) in 1955 for the use of party agitators outlined the seriousness of "flight from the republic":

Both from the moral standpoint as well as in terms of the interests of the whole German nation, leaving the GDR is an act of political and moral backwardness and depravity.

Those who let themselves be recruited objectively serve West German Reaction and militarism, whether they know it or not. Is it not despicable when for the sake of a few alluring job offers or other false promises about a "guaranteed future" one leaves a country in which the seed for a new and more beautiful life is sprouting, and is already showing the first fruits, for the place that favors a new war and destruction?

Is it not an act of political depravity when citizens, whether young people, workers, or members of the intelligentsia, leave and betray what our people have created through common labor in our republic to offer themselves to the American or British secret services or work for the West German factory owners, Junkers, or militarists? Does not leaving the land of progress for the morass of an historically outdated social order demonstrate political backwardness and blindness? ...

[W]orkers throughout Germany will demand punishment for those who today leave the German Democratic Republic, the strong bastion of the fight for peace, to serve the deadly enemy of the German people, the imperialists and militarists.

Some estimates put the number of those who left the East Berlin, the Soviet occupation zone, and the GDR between 1945 and 1961 at between 3 and 3.5 million people. Close to one million of those who left were refugees and expellees from World War II and the post-war era initially stranded in the Soviet zone or East Berlin.

=== Berlin Wall construction and criminalized emigration ===
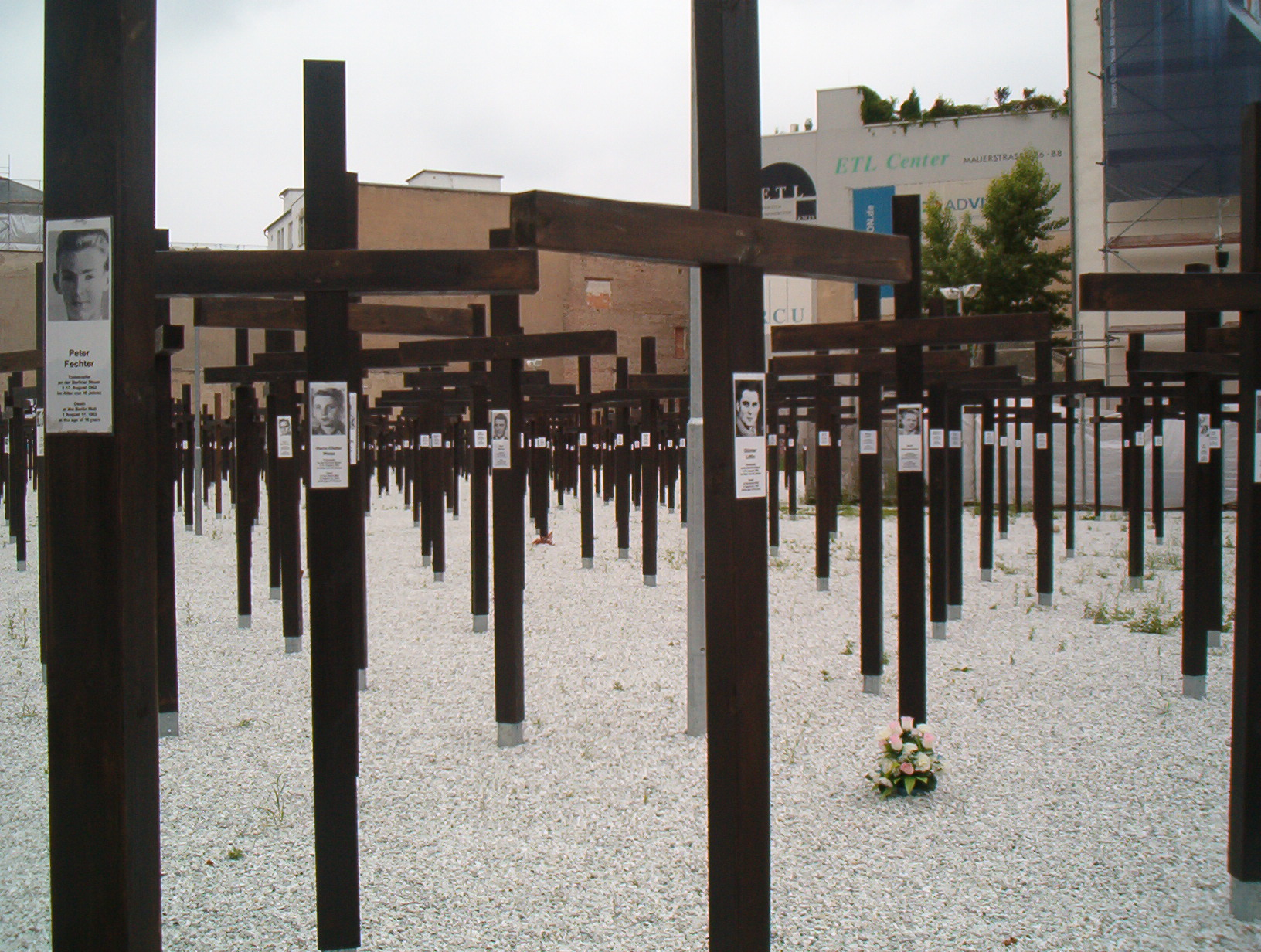
A memorial in Berlin from 2004 to 2005 to those who lost their lives attempting to cross the Berlin Wall near Checkpoint Charlie

Republikflucht was effectively criminalized after the GDR began erecting the Berlin Wall on 13 August 1961, which saw the extreme tightening of emigration across the Iron Curtain. The large numbers of emigrants was regarded as an embarrassment for the GDR leadership, owing to its competition with the Federal Republic, and undermined its legitimacy as an independent state. The number of people leaving the GDR following the construction of the Berlin Wall dropped sharply from hundreds of thousands to only several hundred per year.

=== Illegal emigration ===
Between 1961 and 1989 several thousand East German citizens emigrated by obtaining temporary exit visas and subsequently failing to return, or by engaging in dangerous attempts to cross the Berlin Wall, the Inner German border, or the borders of other Eastern Bloc countries. Those who fled across the fortified borders did so at considerable personal risk of injury or death (see: List of deaths at the Berlin Wall), with several hundred Republikflüchtlinge dying in accidents or by being shot by the GDR Border Troops, while some 75,000 were caught and imprisoned.

West Germany allowed refugees from the Soviet sector of Berlin, the Soviet zone, or East Germany to apply to be accepted as Vertriebene (expellees) of the sub-group of Soviet Zone Refugees (Sowjetzonenflüchtlinge) under the Federal Expellee Law (BVFG § 3), and thus receive support from the West German government. They had to have fled before 1 July 1990 in an attempt to rescue themselves from an emergency situation – especially one posing a threat to health, life, personal freedom, or freedom of conscience – created by the political conditions imposed by the regime in the territory from which they had escaped (BVFG § 3). The law did not apply to influential former supporters of the eastern political system or to offenders against legality and humanity during the period of Nazi rule or thereafter within East Berlin or East Germany, and finally it was not applicable to any who had fought against the democracy in West Germany or West Berlin (BVFG § 3 (2)).

== Legacy ==
In 1993, three years after German reunification, the former East German leader Erich Honecker was charged with having ordered soldiers to kill people trying to escape. The trial was postponed due to his bad health, and he died in 1994. Former Stasi chief Erich Mielke was also put on trial on the same charge. In November 1994, however, the presiding judge closed the proceedings, ruling that the defendant was not mentally fit to stand trial.

== See also ==
- Escape attempts and victims of the inner German border
- Eastern Bloc emigration and defection
- North Korean defectors
- West Germans Leaving to East Germany
