= D-442 FUG =

D-442 FUG / D-944 PSZH
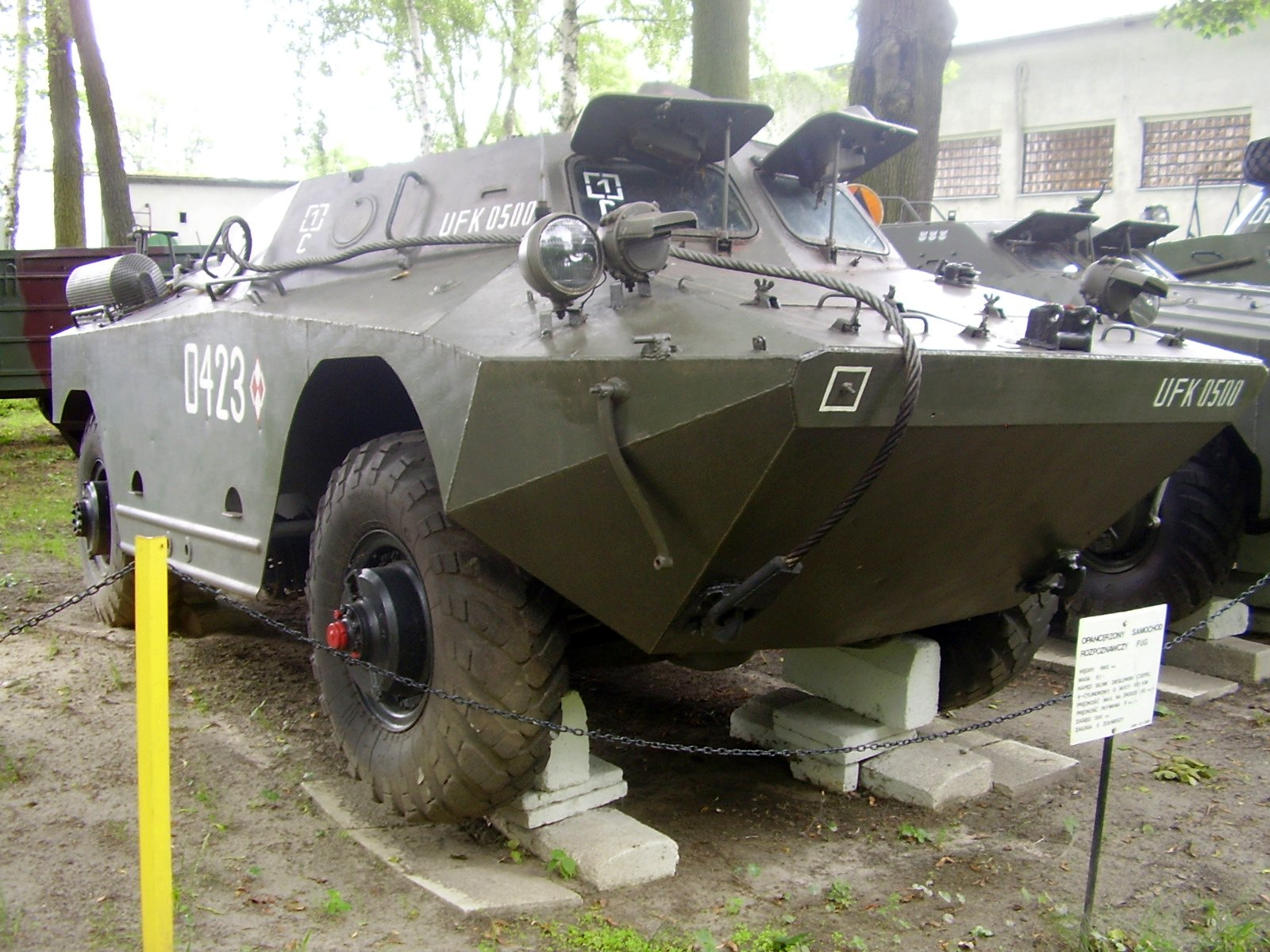
- Polish D-442 FUG at a museum
- Type: Amphibious armoured scout car
- Place of origin: Hungary

Service history
- In service: Early 1964 – present
- Used by: See Operators
- Wars: See Service history

Production history
- Designed: Early 1960s (D-442 FUG); Late 1960s (D-944 PSzH)
- Produced: Early 1964 – ?

Specifications
- Mass: D-442 FUG: 6.3 t (6.2 long tons; 6.9 short tons); D-944 PSZH: 7.5 t (7.4 long tons; 8.3 short tons)
- Length: 5.79 m (19 ft 0 in)
- Width: 2.5 m (8 ft 2 in)
- Height: 1.91 m (6 ft 3 in) (D-442 FUG)
- Crew: 2 (driver and commander) + 4 scouts (D-442 FUG); 3 (driver, gunner and commander) + 4 scouts (D-944 PSZH)
- Armor: Welded steel 13 mm maximum (D-442 FUG); 14 mm maximum (D-944 PSZH) sides 7 mm
- Main armament: 7.62 mm UK light machine gun (model 59) (D-442 FUG); 14.5 mm KPVT heavy machine gun (500 rounds) (D-944 PSZH)
- Secondary armament: None (D-442 FUG); 7.62 mm PKT coaxial general-purpose machine gun (2000 rounds) (D-944 PSZH)
- Engine: Csepel D414.44 in-line 4-cylinder OHV 5.5-litre diesel 101 hp (75 kW)
- Power/weight: D-442 FUG: 16 hp/tonne (11.9 kW/tonne); D-944 PSZH: 13.5 hp/tonne (10 kW/tonne)
- Suspension: Wheeled 4x4 (+ 4 auxiliary wheels), leaf springs with hydraulic shock absorbers
- Ground clearance: 340 mm
- Fuel capacity: 200 L or 2x75 L
- Operational range: D-442 FUG: 600 km (370 mi); D-944 PSZH: 500 km (310 mi)
- Maximum speed: 87 km/h (road) (D-442 FUG); 81 km/h (50 mph) (road) (D-944 PSZH); 45 km/h (cross country); 9 km/h (water)

The D-442 FUG (Hungarian: Felderítő Úszó Gépkocsi, lit. 'amphibious reconnaissance vehicle') and D-944 PSZH (Hungarian: Páncélozott Személyszállító Harcjármű, lit. 'armored personnel carrier') are the result of the Hungarian domestic development of a relatively cheap amphibious armoured scout car and armoured personnel carrier series. The FUG and PSZH were exported with limited success and are also known under their Czechoslovak designation, OT-65.

== Development and characteristics ==
Due to its similarities with the Soviet BRDM series of armoured scout cars, the D-442 FUG is often misidentified as a modification of the BRDM-1. Although the FUG has a similar appearance to the BRDM-2, major differences reflect its independent design.

The Hungarian military abandoned a domestic armoured reconnaissance car project based on the World War II-era Csaba because the Soviet government promised to sell large numbers of old BA-64s from Soviet reserves at a low price. Hungary never received the BAs, leaving the Hungarian People's Army without a wheeled armoured reconnaissance vehicle from 1945 until the 1960s. The need for reconnaissance vehicles and persistent shortages of Soviet APCs and scout cars encouraged the domestic development and mass production of a cheap reconnaissance vehicle. To hasten development and reduce costs, the design largely used existing civilian parts and boat-manufacturing experience.

The hull was designed by the Danube Shipyard to maximize buoyancy when crossing rivers. This produced a more angular shape than the BRDM-1's boat-like hull; it also used two waterjets for amphibious propulsion instead of the single one found on the BRDM-1. The powertrain was almost completely of domestic design: the engine, winch, and rear axle came from Csepel D-344 trucks; the front suspension was a variant from Ikarus buses; and the transmission and transfer system were designed by Rába. The design retained the BRDM-1's belly wheels. Unlike the BRDM-1's conventional 4x4 vehicle layout, the FUG is more similar to the BRDM-2, featuring a rear engine compartment and a front crew compartment. The transmission is located in the middle, which makes the crew compartment noisy.

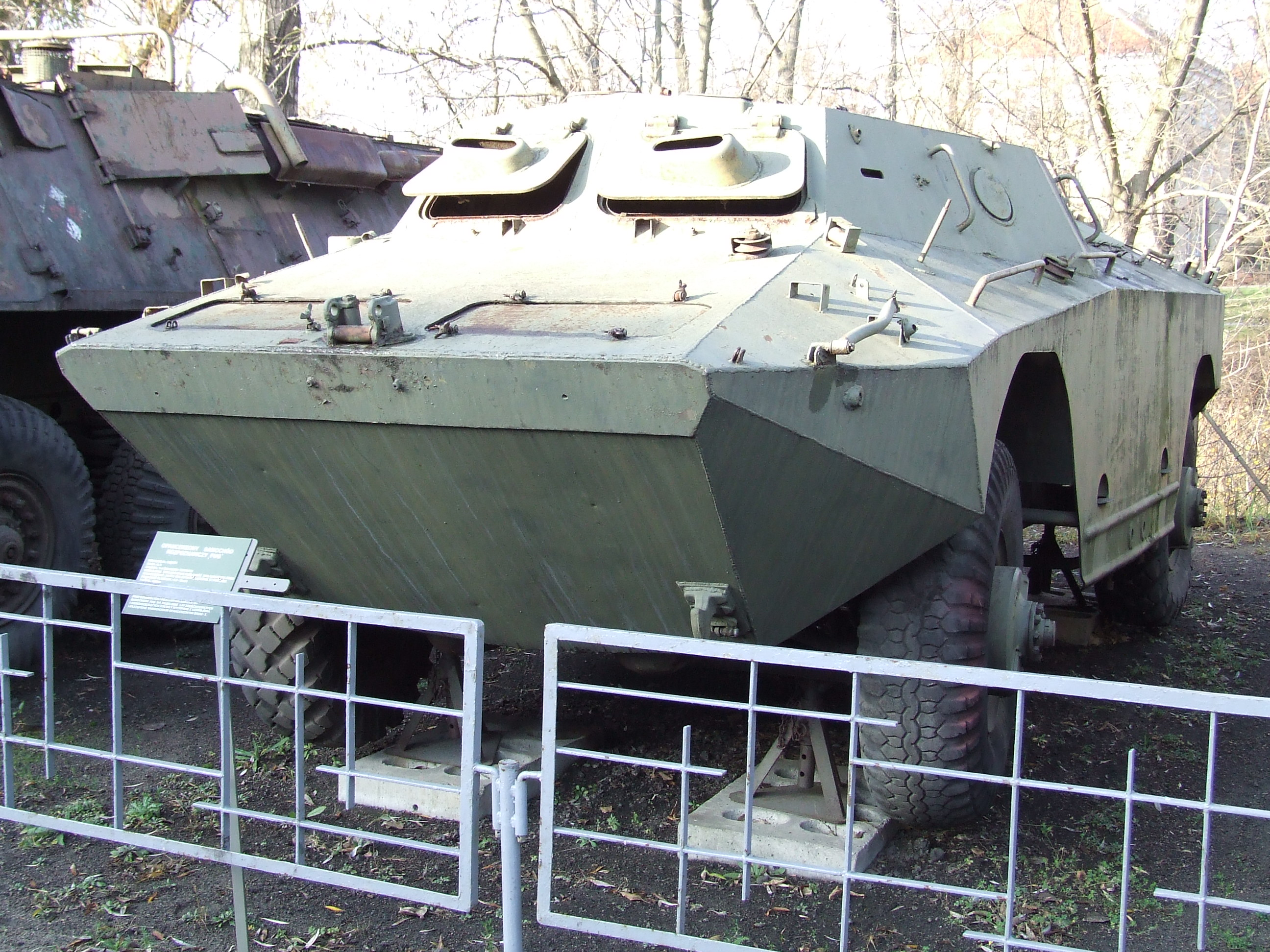
Polish D-442 FUG in a museum. The armoured shutters with integral vision blocks on the windshields and a single firing port on the left-hand side of the hull are visible.

The FUG was lightly armoured with welded rolled homogeneous steel plates, 13 mm thick at the front and 7 mm thick at the sides and rear. During production, every plate was test-fired upon for quality control, and traces of this testing are visible on the vehicles. The armour was sufficient against small-arms fire and shell splinters but not .50-calibre fire. The vehicle has very few penetration points at the bottom of the hull, providing good mine protection. To facilitate this, the front axle had external fastening points rather than screws through the belly plate, and only the steering rod penetrated the armour.

The development of a domestically designed small turret with an anti-tank rocket launcher and PKT machine gun was abandoned for political reasons. The turret was highly similar to the one on the OT-62B but with a significantly lower silhouette. Consequently, a major drawback of the D-442 FUG was a lack of permanent armament and firing ports. Operating the pintle-mounted front 7.62 mm light machine gun required the gunner to be exposed to counter-fire.

The vehicle shares the seating configuration and infrared driving lights of the BRDM-1 and BRDM-2. Like the BRDM-1, it has no permanent armament, windshields that can be replaced in combat with armoured shutters, and two firing ports on each side of the troop compartment. Both the driver and the commander can use episcopes to view the battlefield.

The D-442 FUG has hatches over the commander's and driver's stations and a round escape hatch in the floor. The vehicle is equipped with a winch, primarily for self-recovery when stuck in difficult terrain. To improve cross-country capability, the driver may use the central tyre-pressure regulation system to temporarily decrease the pressure in all tyres before crossing an obstacle. The four auxiliary belly wheels can be lowered hydraulically for crossing obstacles and gaps. In water, the vehicle is driven by two water jets that are steered by reversing thrust. Stability in water is improved by a trim board erected at the front before entering the water, which serves as additional armour on land.

It was designed primarily for reconnaissance behind enemy lines and was converted for artillery observation, mobile command/observation, and NBC reconnaissance. The Hungarian FUG version can be fitted with a pintle-mounted RPD LMG, but on the OT-65 the main weapon was a 7.62 mm UK (vz. 59) general-purpose machine gun with electromagnetic release.

== Development of PSZH ==
The FUG's drawbacks and a lack of modern APCs in the Warsaw Pact prompted the development of the D-944 PSZH in the late 1960s. The PSZH was designed as Hungary's main APC. The vehicle had small two-part side doors and lacked auxiliary belly wheels. The PSZH had a turret armed with a 14.5 mm KPVT heavy machine gun and a 7.62 mm coaxial general-purpose machine gun protected by thin but sloped armour. Both weapons could be elevated between -5 and +30 degrees. The turret has an IR spotlight next to the armament and on top, and a radio antenna on the back of the turret. Like the BRDM-1 and BRDM-2, there were hatches over the driver's and commander's stations. The turret used in the D-944 PSZH had better ergonomics and observation capabilities compared to the BRDM-2's BPU-1 turret.

The PSZH had a similar layout to the FUG but carried six troops and three crew members. The commander and driver sat at the front, and the gunner was in the turret, while the passengers sat on the sides of the hull in place of the FUG's belly wheels. The rear troops had an internal radio and could observe to the rear and sides. The middle troops sat just inside the door and could use their weapons with the upper part of the door open.

The D-944 PSZH had slightly better protection, with maximum armour of 14 mm, and also introduced an NBC protection system and infrared night-vision equipment. As a modification of the D-442 FUG, it also has a round escape hatch in the floor. Buoyancy was improved slightly to accommodate the turret's weight.

== Service history ==
FUG armoured scout cars were used by Hungary, Czechoslovakia, Poland, Bulgaria, East Germany, and Romania. Hungary also developed the PSZH-IV armoured personnel carrier from the D-944 PSZH armoured scout car. The PSZH-IV prototype first appeared in 1966 and took part in only a single manoeuvre parade in Bratislava, mounting an egg-shaped turret and a dummy automatic cannon. The PSZH-IV was first thought to be an armoured scout car by the West due to its small size and 4x4 configuration, and was dubbed the FUG-66 or FUG-70 after the FUG 4x4 scout car.

The PSZH-IV is no longer in service with Hungary but remains in reserve. Czechoslovakia sold its OT-65 vehicles to Iraq. Iraq also bought the PSZH-IV APC. The vehicles were likely used by the Iraqi Army during the Iran–Iraq War, the Persian Gulf War, and the 2003 invasion of Iraq.

== Variants ==
=== Hungary ===
- D-442.00 FÚG – Basic armoured scout car without the turret. It had an R-113 or R-114 radio.
  - D-442.01 PK-FÚG (parancsnoki) – Command vehicle version with R-113 or R-114 and R-114M or R-112 radio for platoon and company commanders. Later, an R-403 or R-407 relay was included for company and battalion commanders.
  - D-442.03 VS-FÚG (vegyi sugárfelderítő úszó gépkocsi) – NBC reconnaissance vehicle based on the D-442 FÚG with specialized chemical, biological, and radiological detection equipment and flag dispensers for marking contaminated areas.
  - D-442.01 MRP-FÚG (páncélozott repülőirányító pont) – Forward air controller post, based on the D-442 PK-FÚG with an R-114 and an R-159 radio.
  - D-442.02 MÜ-FÚG (műszaki) – Engineer reconnaissance vehicle with special equipment.

==== PSZH APC ====
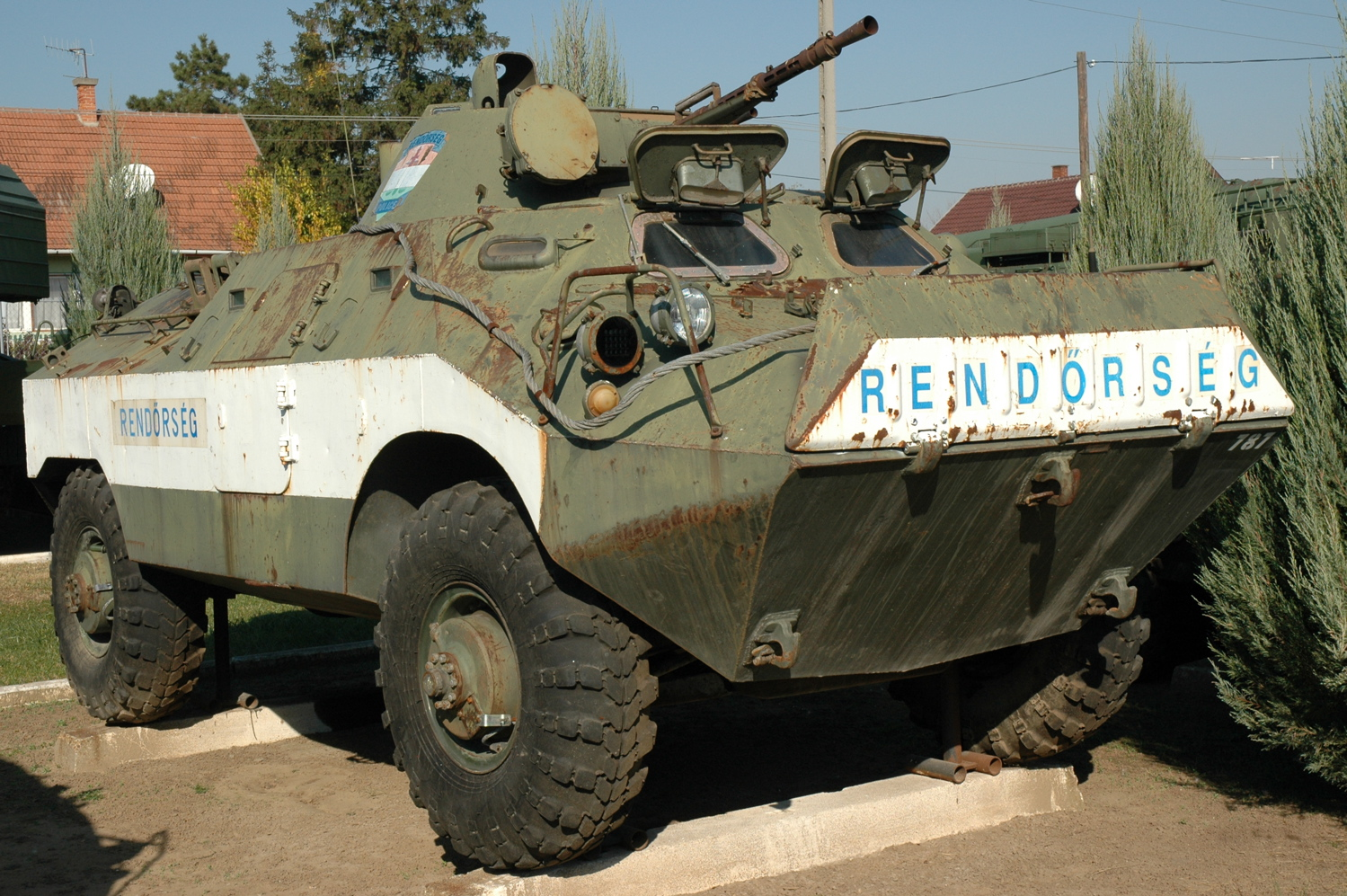
PSZH in Hungarian police livery

- D-944.00 PSZH (1970–1979) – Armoured personnel carrier with a small two-part side door on both sides of the hull and a turret armed with a 14.5 mm KPVT heavy machine gun and a 7.62 mm KGKT coaxial general-purpose machine gun.
- PSZH-2: Four-axis redesignation of the PSZH with a complete BMP-1 turret mounted with a 73 mm 2A28 Grom main armament. No prototype was built.
- D-944.00M PSzH-M (1988) – Rebuilt original D-944.00 with an R-123 radio and a PKT machine gun instead of the old KGKT. The motor was a 110 hp D-414.44/2 diesel.
  - D-944.00 PSZH-F – Armoured personnel carrier for reconnaissance platoons and companies.
  - D-944.77 PSZH – Armoured personnel carrier for the Hungarian Border Guard and internal security police troops. It was developed from the basic APC version with minor changes and retained a turret, unlike the German PSZH-IV-10.
  - D-944.31 SZDPK-PSZH – Command vehicle for mechanized company commanders, based on the D-944.00 PSzH with two R-123 radios and an antenna. It has an additional R-107 radio in the troop compartment. Inside, there was space for only two personnel: one for the radioman and one (plus a map-desk) for the commander.
  - D-944.21 ZPK-PSZH (zászlóaljparancsnoki) – Command vehicle for mechanized battalion commanders and for reconnaissance company commanders, based on the D-944 PSzH with additional radios and an additional radio antenna on the right-hand side of the hull. It has two R-123 radios and one R-130 radio, plus two additional R-107 radios in the troop compartment.
  - D-944.22 ZTÖF-PSZH – Command vehicle for mechanized battalion staff chiefs and for reconnaissance platoon commanders, based on the D-944 PSzH with additional radios and an additional radio antenna on the right-hand side of the hull. It has one R-123 and one R-130 radio, plus two additional R-107 radios in the troop compartment.
  - D-944.21 OPK-PSZH – Command vehicle for towed artillery battalion commanders with three R-123MT radios and artillery reconnaissance equipment (ET-68 laser rangefinder in the turret in place of the KPVT gun, VOP reconnaissance instrument on the right side of the hull, and others). The armament consists of only one PKT machine gun.

=== Former Czechoslovakia ===
- OT-65 (Obrněný Transportér vz. 65) – Czechoslovak version of the D-442 FUG armoured scout car.
  - OT-65ZDR (zdravotní) – OT-65 converted into an armoured ambulance.
  - OT-65A "Vydra" (Otter) – OT-65 with a turret from the Czechoslovak OT-62B TOPAS. The entry hatches were moved to be positioned behind the turret. It also has additional protection on the IR driving lights.
  - OT-65Ch (chemický) – Variant with specialized chemical, biological, and radiological detection devices as well as flag dispensers used to mark contaminated areas.
  - OT-65ChV (velitelsko-chemický) – Variant with specialized chemical, biological, and radiological detection devices as well as flag dispensers used to mark contaminated areas.
  - OT-65DP – Armoured artillery forward observation post.
  - OT-65DPP (pohyblivá dělostřelecká pozorovatelna) – Armoured artillery forward observation post.
  - OT-65 R-2 – Communication vehicle with additional radio set R-2.
  - OT-65 R-112 – Communication vehicle with additional radio set R-112.
  - OT-65RL – Variant fitted with a battlefield surveillance radar PSNR-1.
  - OT-65VP – FAC vehicle with additional radios. Similar to the Hungarian MRP-FÚG.
- OT-66 (Obrněný Transportér vz. 66) – Czechoslovak designation for the D-944 PSzH.

=== Former East Germany ===
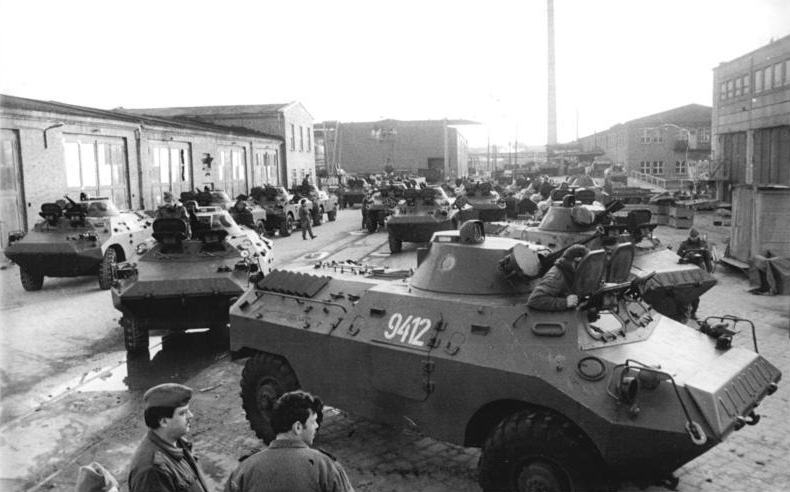
Grenztruppen PSzH-IV.

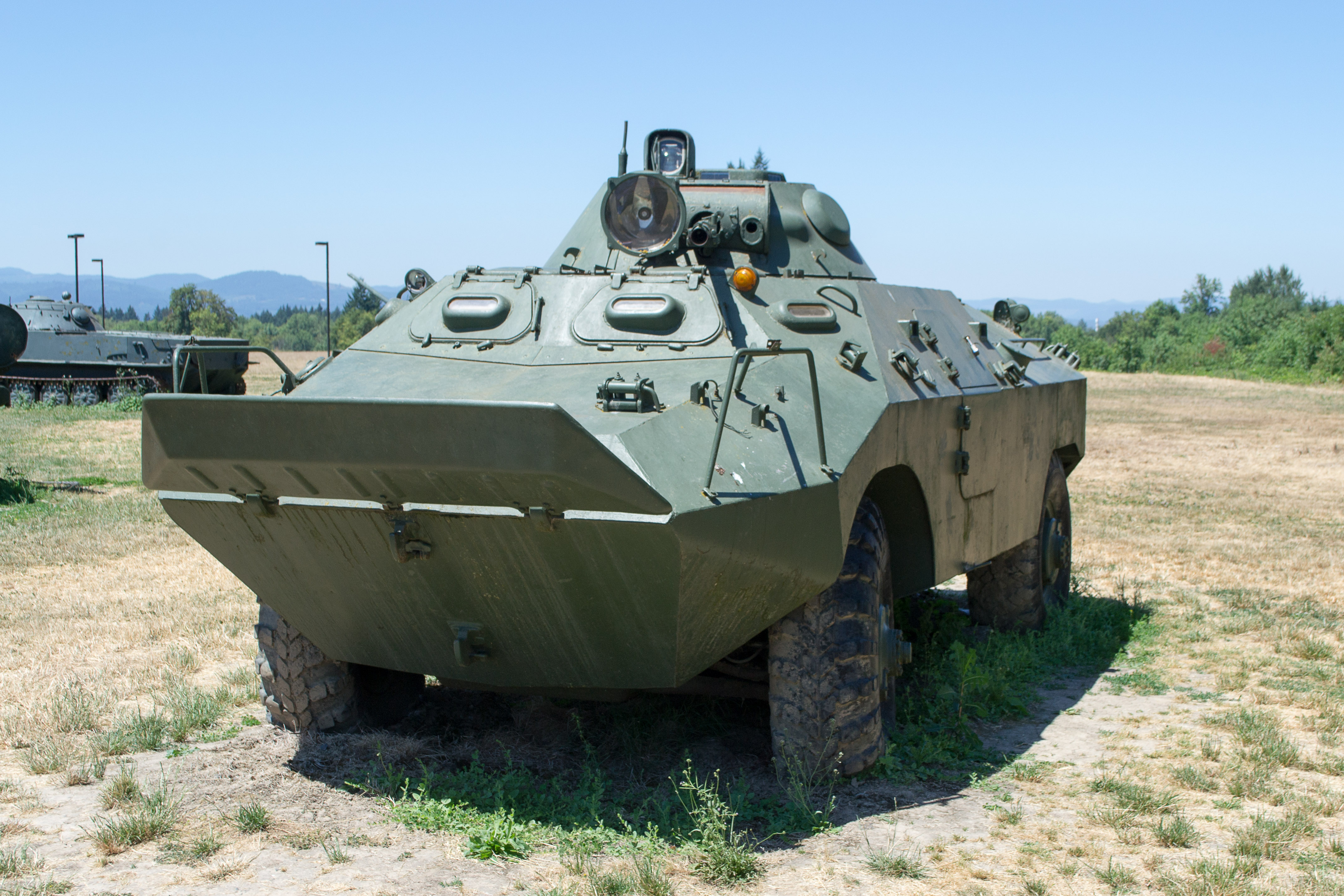
Restored PSzH-IV at the Evergreen Aviation & Space Museum, United States

- D-944.40 PSzH-IV – Hungarian export designation for APCs of the East German border guards (Grenztruppen – GT). GT designator: SPW-PSH (Schützenpanzerwagen). The SPW-PSH was also found in some paramilitary units such as the Bereitschaftspolizei (riot police). Of the 692 SPWs delivered between 1970 and 1976, several were modified into new types by the "Panzerwerkstatt-2" from 1979:
  - SPW-PSH (Ch) – Modification of 12 existing vehicles into NBC reconnaissance vehicles with specialized chemical, biological, and radiological detection devices as well as two flag dispensers used to mark contaminated areas.
  - SPW-PSH (Artl) – Thirty-nine PSHs were modified into reconnaissance vehicles for artillery units of the border troops. They had additional signals equipment (and three whip antennae at the rear hull) and an optical range finder OEM-2 that was transported in a large box on top of the engine deck.
  - SPW-PSH (Pi) – Twenty-eight vehicles of the border troops were converted into combat engineer (Pionier) reconnaissance vehicles with a crew of 7 and equipped with portable mine detection systems MSG-46M, a chain saw PS-90, explosives, etc.
  - SPW-PSH-Agitprop – Agitation and propaganda vehicle.
- D-944.41 PSzH-IV – Battalion commander's vehicle with telescopic mast HTM-10, GT designator SPW-PSH (K1).
- D-944.42 PSzH-IV – Company commander's vehicle, GT designator SPW-PSH (K2).
- PSzH-IV-10 – Turretless PSzH-IV used by the border guards.

=== Iraq ===
- D-944.50 PSzH-IV – Hungarian export designation for APCs sold to Iraq.
- D-944.53 PSzH-IV – Hungarian export designation for company commander's vehicle sold to Iraq.

== Operators ==
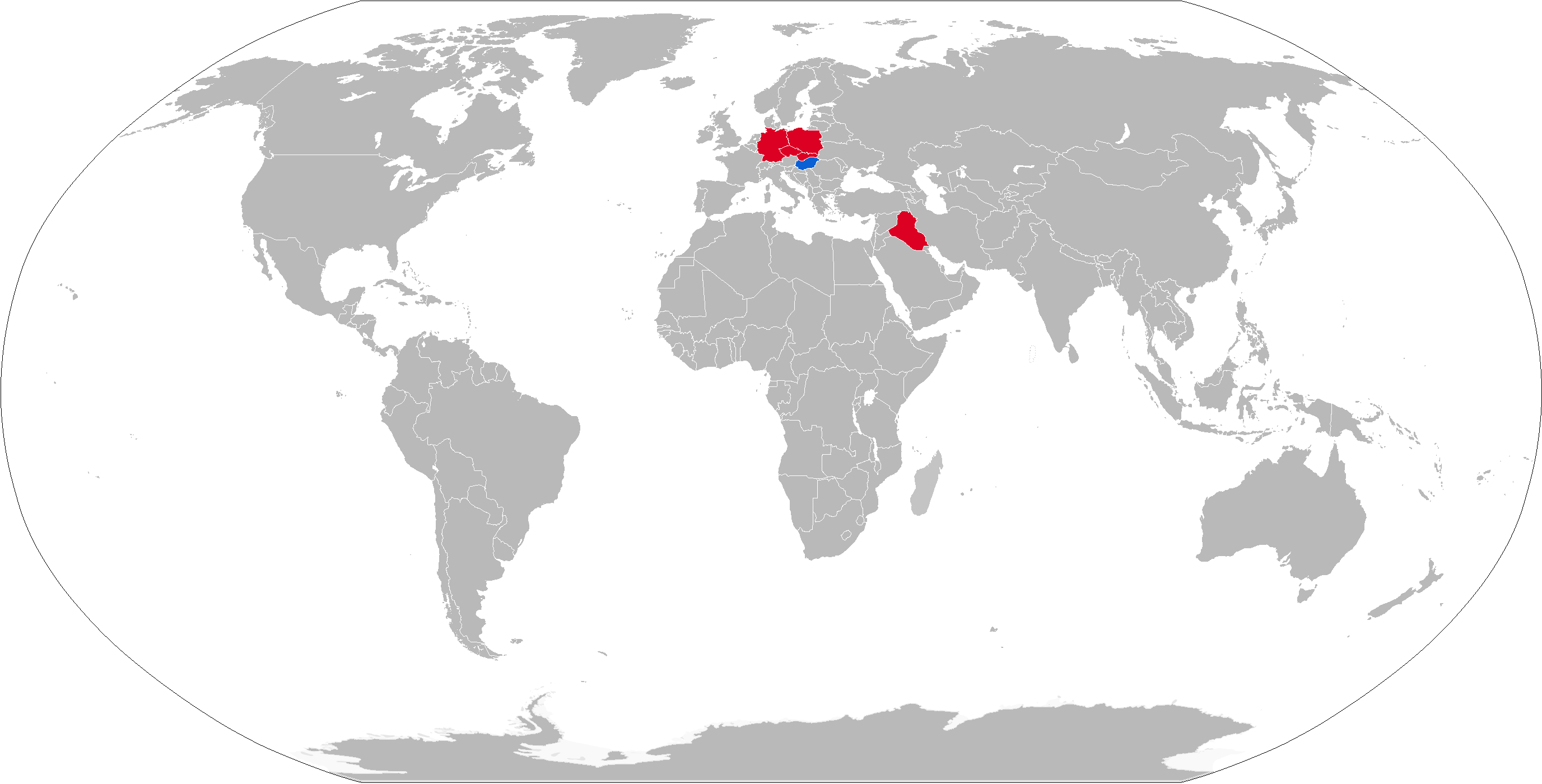
Map of D-442 FUG operators in blue, with former operators in red

=== Current operators ===
- Hungary: The remaining vehicles are mostly in reserve storage.

=== Former operators ===
- Czechoslovakia: 275 ordered in 1965 and delivered by 1968. Czechoslovak designation OT-65A Otter. Another 200 PSzH were also acquired and designated OT-66.
- East Germany: 50 PSzH.
- Iraq: 200 PSzH-IV received in 1981; probably replaced in service by the BRDM-2.
- Poland: 100 OT-65A Otters.
- South Yemen - A few PSzH vehicles were received as East German military aid.

== See also ==
"Combat Reconnaissance/Patrol Vehicle" with rear engine:

- ABC-79M – (Romania)
- BRDM-2 – (Soviet Union)
- Textron Tactical Armoured Patrol Vehicle – (Canada)
- RBY MK 1 – (Israel)
- Fennek – (Germany)
