= Border violence as a crime against humanity =

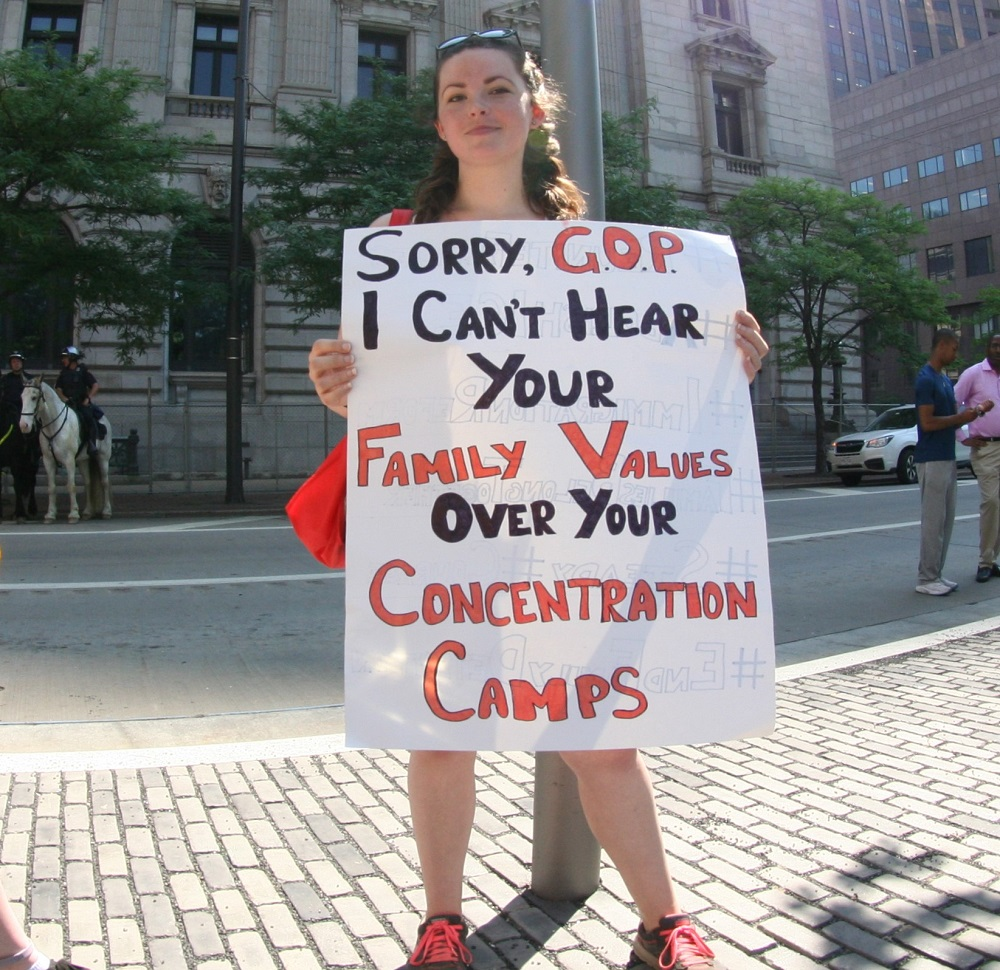
A protester at a rally against family separation in the United States describing immigration detention facilities as concentration camps.

Some legal scholars and activists have argued that common forms of border control instituted in the twenty-first century by Western countries such as European Union member states, Australia, and the United States meet the definition of crimes against humanity and should be prosecuted by domestic and international courts.

== Crimes ==
Possible crimes against humanity could be murder, imprisonment, deportation, persecution, and enforced disappearance.

== Support and opposition ==
Proponents of the idea include Nuremberg trials prosecutor Benjamin Ferencz, who described the Trump administration family separation policy as a crime against humanity.

Ioannis Kalpouzos and Itamar Mann have published multiple papers on the subject. Kalpouzos cautions that it is daring to imagine that International Criminal Law (ICL) can be "anything but a hegemonic governance practice of powerful actors who seek to defeat their weaker enemies in law as well as in fact".

== Legal efforts ==
A previous legal complaint to the International Criminal Court about Australian border policies decided some legal questions on behalf of the accusers, but found there was insufficient evidence of crimes against humanity being committed. Although as of 2020, the ICC prosecutor was investigating crimes against humanity against migrants in Libya, she did not mention that she was investigating any European complicity in their actions. In 2025, lawyers filed a request with the ICC identifying 122 politicians and officials from European Union countries as co-perpetrators of crimes against humanity committed in Libya, as part of the European Union's externalization policies. Among the individuals listed are Mark Rutte, Donald Tusk, Frederica Mogherini, and Fabrice Leggeri. One of the lawyers involved, Omer Shatz, described it as "legally... a very solid case", comparing the relationship between the Libyan Coast Guard and the European Union to when local individuals participated in the Holocaust on orders from Berlin.

As of 2021, the legal success of this approach has been limited.

== See also ==
- Global apartheid
