= Schwedt military prison =

Military prison in the German Democratic Republic

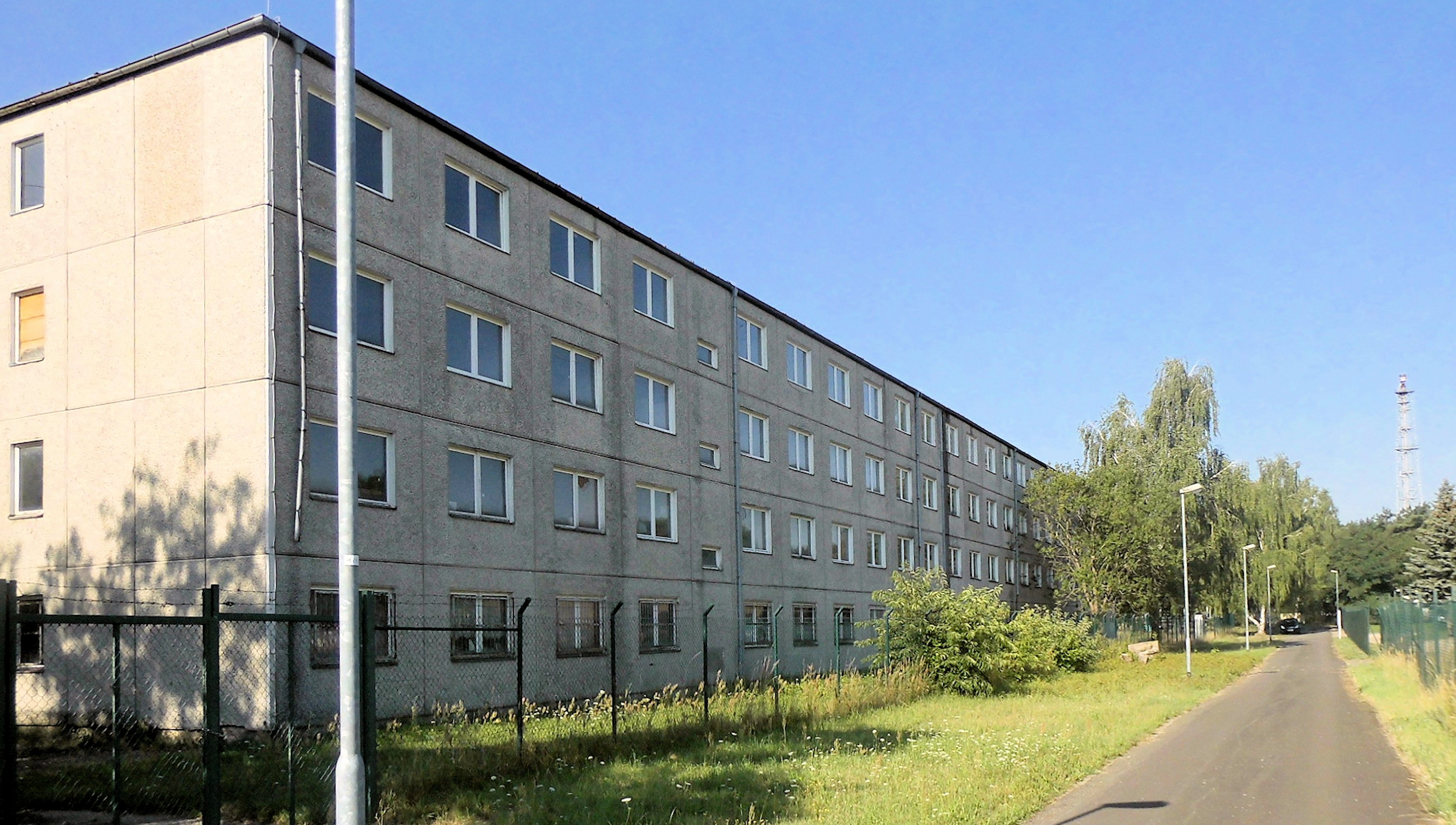
Accommodation block of the disciplinary unit

The Schwedt military prison was the only military prison in the German Democratic Republic which was opened in 1968 and was located in the northeastern city of Schwedt. It was used for the imprisonment of members of the National People's Army and the Volkspolizei-Bereitschaft of Ministerium des Innern (DDR). Around half of those detained were for crimes such as assault, theft, but also "anti-state agitation" or defamation of the state, and military crimes such as refusal to obey orders, desertion, or consuming alcohol on duty. Smaller offenses were often used as an excuse to suppress political dissent, the expression of individuality and different thinking and to punish them under the pretext of the rule of law of the GDR.

The facility was fully closed on May 31, 1990. The prison barracks were demolished in the 1990s, while the four-story administration building has occasionally been used as a shelter for the homeless.

== Bibliography ==
- Dressler, Torsten (2013), Stillgestanden – Blick zur Flamme: Das DDR-Militärstrafgefängnis und die NVA-Disziplinareinheit in Schwedt-Oder von 1968–1990, Baugeschichte, Bestandsdokumentation und Zeitzeugenberichte [Standing still - looking at the flames: the GDR military prison and the NVA disciplinary unit in Schwedt-Oder from 1968-1990, building history, inventory documentation and contemporary witness reports] (in German), Berlin/Bonn: Westkreuz-Verlag GmbH, p. 448, ISBN 978-3-944836-10-2
- Wenzke, Rüdiger (2011), Ab nach Schwedt! Die Geschichte des DDR-Militärstrafvollzugs (in German), Berlin: Ch. Links, ISBN 978-3-86153-638-3
- Kampa, Nicole (2004), Die Strafgewalt der Kommandeure in der Nationalen Volksarmee (NVA). Eine rechtshistorische und rechtstatsächliche Untersuchung zu dem Rechtsinstitut der "Abgabe von geringfügigen Straftaten" an den Kommandeur [The punitive powers of the commanders in the National People's Army (NVA). A legal-historical and legal-factual study of the legal institution of "submission of minor crimes" to the commander] (in German), Aachen: Shaker, ISBN 3-8322-2108-5 (Berichte aus der Rechtswissenschaft; zugleich: Humboldt-Univ., Diss., Berlin 2003).
- Wachtel, Stefan (1991), Delikt 220. Bestimmungsort Schwedt. Gefängnistagebuch [Offense 220. Destination Schwedt. Prison Diary] (in German), Rudolstadt: Greifenverlag, ISBN 3-7352-0247-0
- Auerswald, Klaus (2010), … sonst kommst du nach Schwedt! Bericht eines Militärstrafgefangenen [... otherwise you will come to Schwedt! Report of a military prisoner] (in German), Rudolstadt: Greifenverlag, ISBN 978-3-86939-521-0
- Joksch, Reinhard; Starina, Stefan (2012), Wer dort war schweigt. Das DDR-Militärgefängnis Schwedt zwischen Mythos und Wahrheit. Inklusive umfangreichem didaktischem Begleitmaterial. Bundesstiftung Aufarbeitung [Who was there is silent. The GDR military prison in Schwedt between myth and truth. Including extensive didactic accompanying material. Federal Foundation for Reprocessing] (in German), Berlin
- Brauhnert, Paul (2011), Tiere in Menschengestalt: Die Anatomie eines Mythos. Militärstrafvollzug Schwedt. Ein Bericht mit Illustrationen. [Animals in Human Form: The Anatomy of a Myth. Military penal system in Schwedt. A report with illustrations.] (in German), KUUUK, ISBN 978-3-939832-28-7
- Brauhnert, Paul; Hübner, Ilja; Polzin, Arno (2013), Der DDR-Militärstrafvollzug und die Disziplinareinheit in Schwedt (1968–1990): Zeitzeugen brechen ihr Schweigen. [The GDR military penal system and the disciplinary unit in Schwedt (1968-1990): Contemporary witnesses break their silence.] (in German), Berlin: Metropol Verlag, ISBN 978-3-86331-150-6
- Polzin, Arno (2018), Mythos Schwedt. DDR-Militärstrafvollzug und NVA-Disziplinareinheit aus dem Blick der Staatssicherheit [Myth Schwedt. GDR military penal system and NVA disciplinary unit from the point of view of state security] (in German), Göttingen: Vandenhoeck & Ruprecht, ISBN 978-3-525-35126-0
