= Border Guard (disambiguation) =

A border guard of a country is a national security agency that performs border security.

Border Guard may also refer to:

- Border Guard (Finland)
- Bundesgrenzschutz, Germany
- Border Guard Forces, Myanmar
- Border Guard (Poland)
- Border Guard Corps, Switzerland

== See also ==
- Border Guard Service (disambiguation)
- Border Patrol (disambiguation)
- Border Security (disambiguation)
- Border Troops (disambiguation)
