= Zollgrenzschutz =

German border patrol organization (1918–1945)

Customs Border Guards
- Zollgrenzschutz
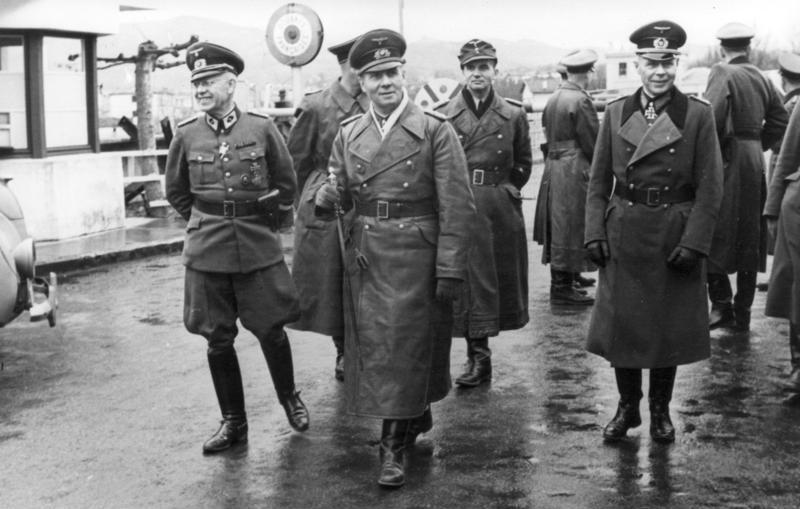
- On the far left, an Oberzollrat of the Zollgrenzschutz

Agency overview
- Formed: 1918
- Dissolved: 8 May 1945
- Type: Paramilitary border guards
- Jurisdiction: Germany
- Agency executive: Minister of the Reich Finance Administration; General Inspector of the Customs Border Guards
- Parent agency: Reich Financial Administration

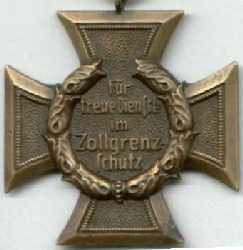
Medal with text meaning, "For Faithful Service in the Customs Border Guards"

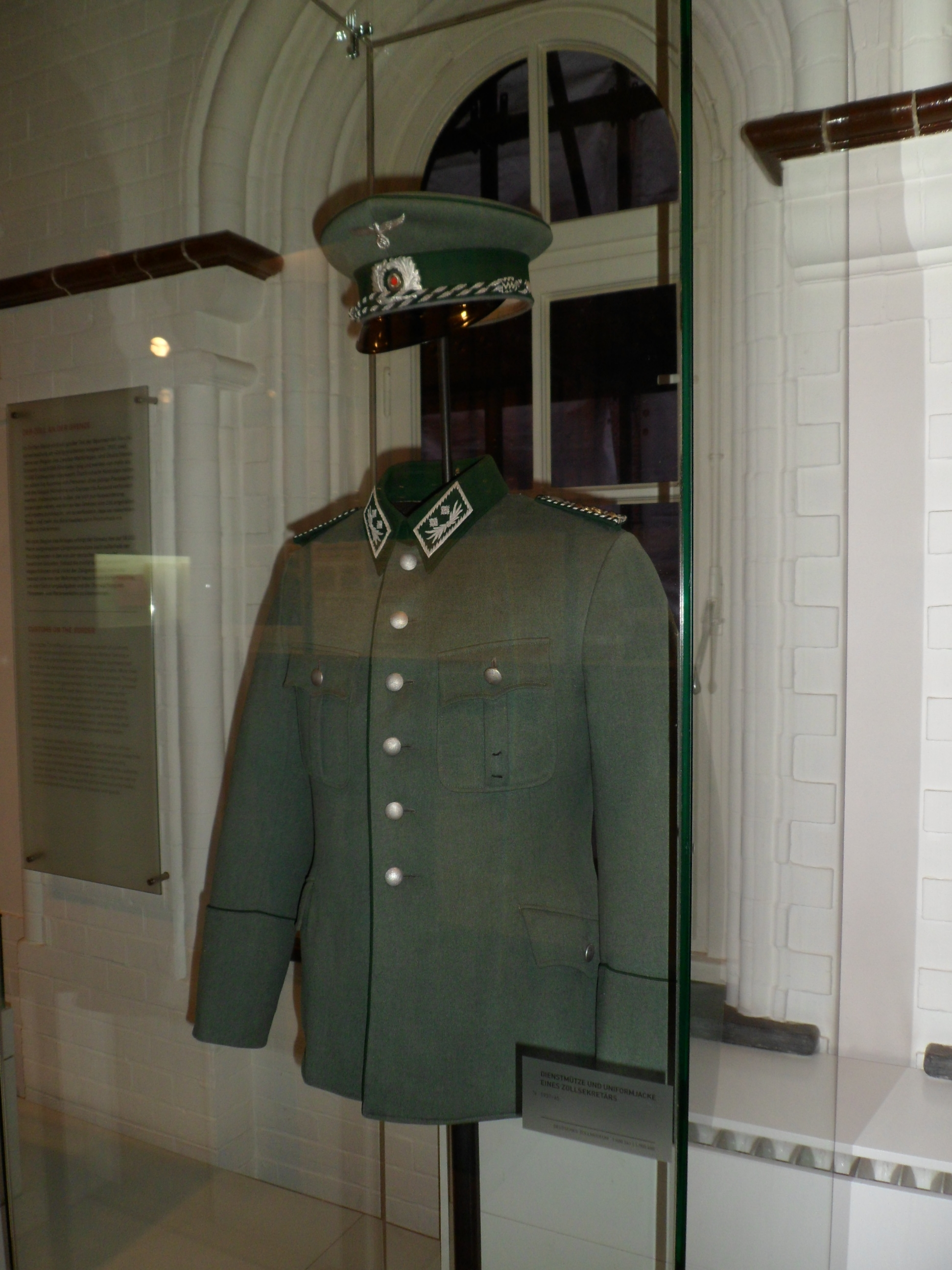
Green ZGS uniform in a museum in Hamburg

Zollgrenzschutz (ZGS; lit. 'Customs Border Guards') was an organization under the German Finance Ministry from 1937 to 1945. It was charged with guarding Germany's borders, acting as a combination of Border Patrol and Customs & Immigration service.

== History ==
It originated in the early 19th century as a tariff enforcement unit of the Prussian government. Reorganized in 1919 under the Weimar Republic following World War I, it gradually became more militarized and transformed into a paramilitary force, also due to the economic woes of blockade, inflation and Great Depression.

In Nazi Germany it was reformed again in 1937 by Fritz Reinhardt, a State Secretary of the Finance Ministry. It came to comprise about 50,000 officials. The Border Police (Grenzpolizei), which had the tasks of passport and border control, was different from the Customs Border Guards (Zollgrenzschutz).

Heinrich Himmler tried to bring the Zollgrenzschutz under the control of the Schutzstaffel (SS), which was unsuccessful at first. During the war, the units were used in occupied territories outside of Germany. A significant portion of younger officials were recruited to the Wehrmacht, leaving the Zollgrenzschutz with older men. After the 20 July 1944 assassination attempt on Hitler, the units were taken out of the control of the Finance Ministry and placed under Amt IV (Gestapo) of the Reich Security Main Office (RSHA).

It was deactivated at the end of World War II in Europe when Germany was partitioned.

== Grades ==
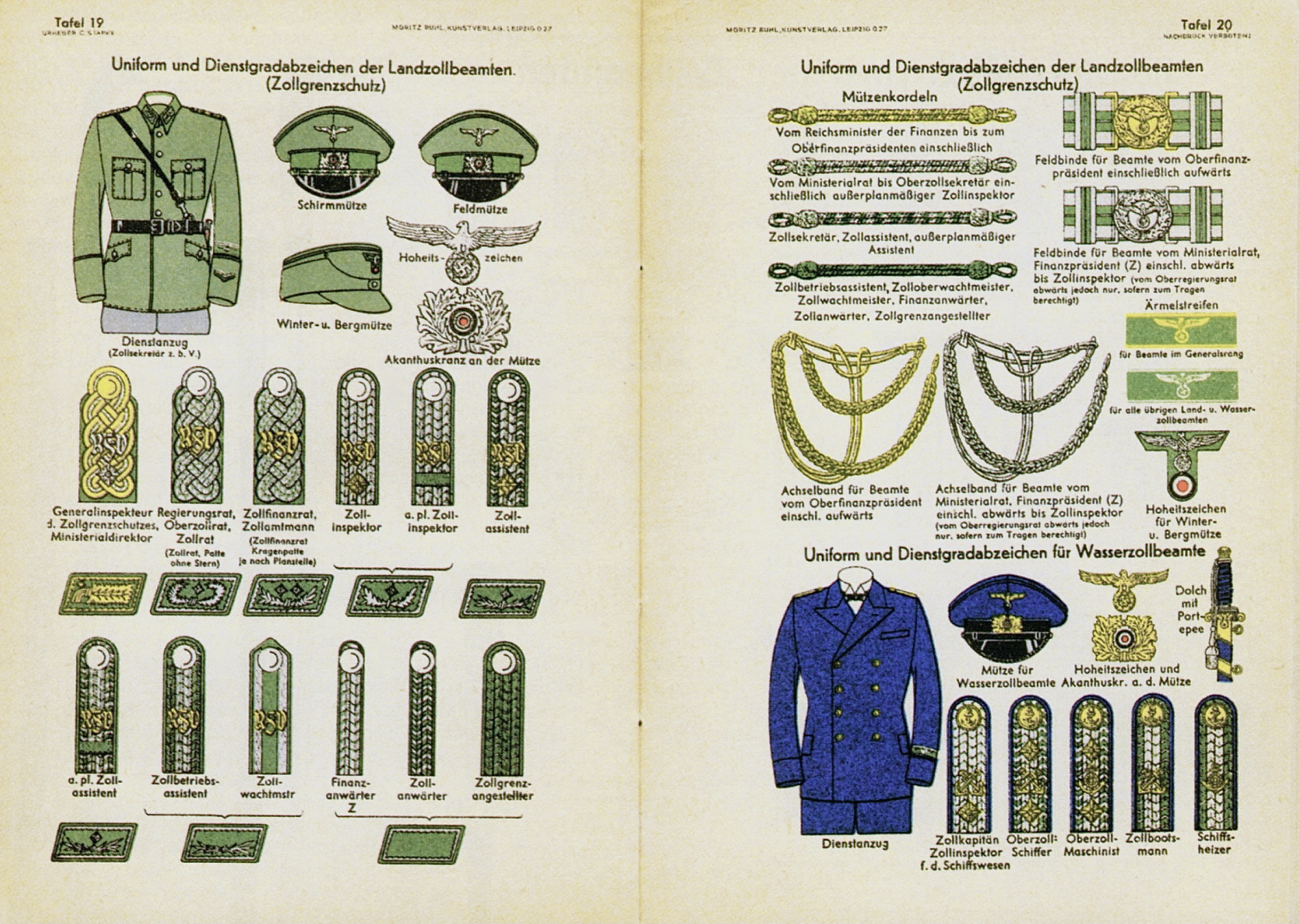
Uniforms and insignia of the ZGS, 1937

| Collar insignia | Shoulder insignia | ZGS Rank | Translation | Heer equivalent |
|---|---|---|---|---|
| | | Reichsminister der Finanzen | Reich Minister of Finance | Generaloberst |
| | | Staatssekretär | State Secretary | General der Waffengattung |
| | | Generalinspekteur des Zollgrenzschutzes; Ministerialdirektor | General Inspector of the Customs Border Guards; Ministerial Director | Generalleutnant |
| | | Oberfinanzpräsident | Senior Finance President | Generalmajor |
| | | Ministerialrat; Finanzpräsident | Ministerial Counsellor; Finance President | Oberst |
| | | Oberregierungsrat | Senior Government Counsellor | Oberstleutnant |
| | | Zollamtmann; Zollrat; Oberzollrat; Regierungsrat | Customs Official; Customs Counsellor; Senior Customs Counsellor; Government Counsellor | Major |
| | | Oberzollinspektor; Regierungsassessor; Regierungsrat with less than three years in the grade | Senior Customs Inspector; Government Assessor; Government Counsellor with less than three years in the grade | Hauptmann |
| | | Zollinspektor | Customs Inspector | Oberleutnant |
| | | Oberzollsekretär | Senior Customs Secretary | Leutnant |
| | | Zollsekretär; Hilfzollsekretär | Customs Secretary | Stabsfeldwebel |
| | | Zollassistent; Hilfzollassistent | Customs Assistant | Oberfeldwebel |
| | | Zollbetriebsassistent; Hilfszollbetriebsassistent | Customs Operations Assistant | Feldwebel |
| | | Zolloberwachtmeister | Customs Senior Watch Master | Unteroffizier |
| | | Zollwachtmeister | Customs Watch Master | Gefreiter; Obergefreiter |
| | | Zollgrenzangestellter | Customs Border Employee | Schütze |

- Ranks in italics with the prefix Hilfs- belonged to the Zollgrenzschutz-Reserve (ZGS-Reserve) (Customs Border Guards), formerly the Verstärkter Grenzaufsichtsdienst (VGAD) (Reinforced Border Inspection Service).

== Bibliography ==
=== 1. The Zollgrenzschutz on the border of Rapallo ===
==== 1.1 Peč/Öfen (border stone nr. 1) – Slugov grič (nr. 32-XXXIX) Sector ====
- Chiussi, Tommaso (2023). Zollgrenzschutz: Border Guards on the Frontier of the Reich, Hauptzollamt Villach, 1941-1945. Atglen: Schiffer Publishing. ISBN 9780764367052.

==== 1.2 Železniki Sector (Customs-Road) ====
- Chiussi, Tommaso (2025). "The Zollaufsichtsstelle (G) Eisnern". Železne niti – Zbornik Selške doline (in Slovenian and English) (22).

==== 1.3 Ljubljana - Postojna - Rijeka Sector ====
- Chiussi, Tommaso (2025). "L'attività della Zollgrenzschutz nella Venezia Giulia". Quaderni Giuliani di Storia (in Italian). XLVI (1).
