= Border Security =

Border Security may refer to:

- Border security, measures taken by governments to enforce their border control policies
- Border Security: Australia's Front Line, Australian television show
- Border Security: Canada's Front Line, Canadian television show
- Border Security Force, Indian border guard for the borders with Bangladesh and Pakistan
  - Border Security Force (football team)
  - Border Security Force (Water Wing)
  - Border Security Force Camel Band

== See also ==
- Border Guard (disambiguation)
- Border Patrol (disambiguation)
