= Grepo =

German abbreviation for border police

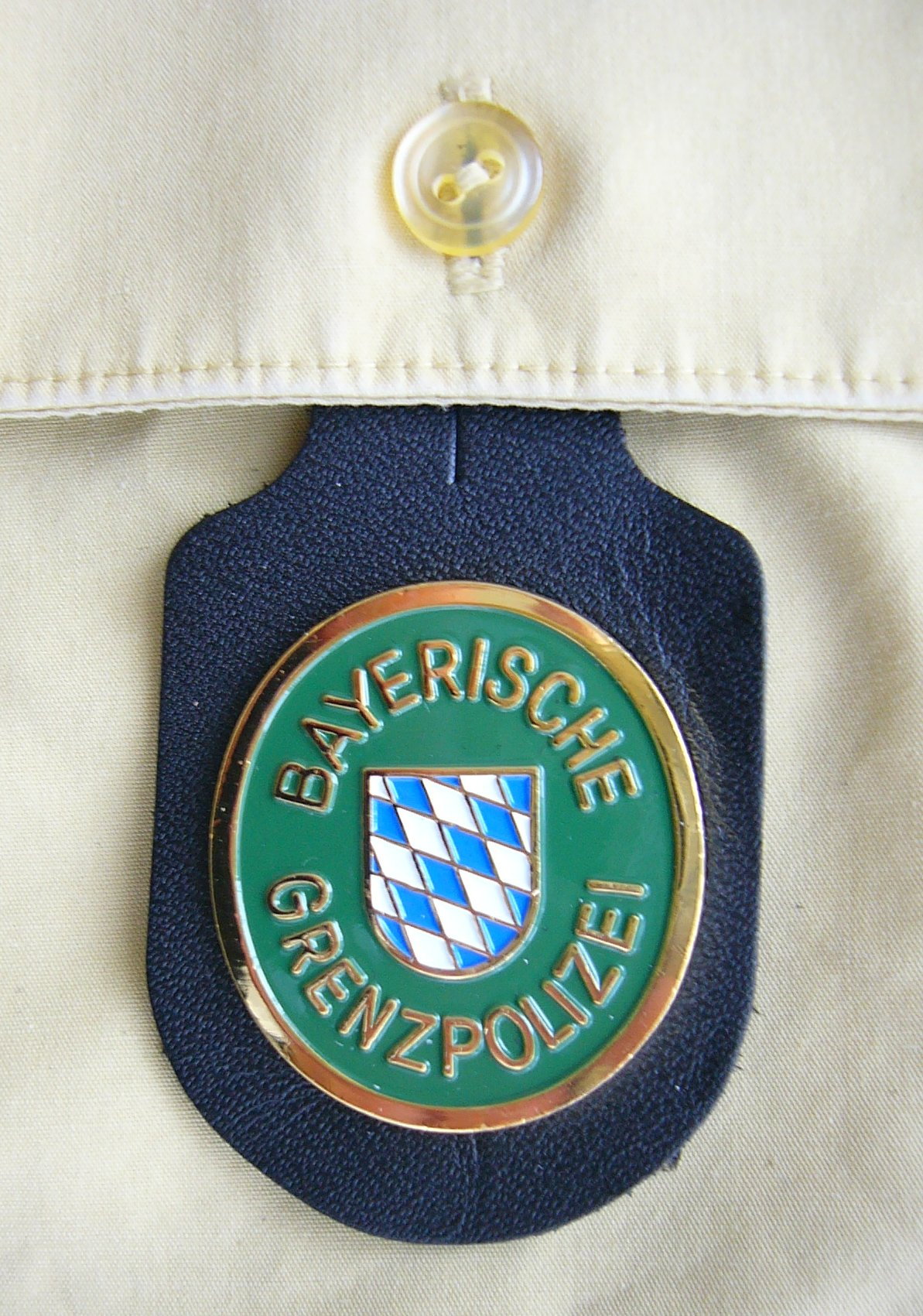
Bavarian Grepo badge

Grepo is the short form of the German word for border police (German: Grenzpolizei). It is usually found in English referring to the Grenztruppen der DDR (Border Troops of the GDR) who guarded the inner German border and the Berlin Wall, but can be used to refer to other border police, such as the former Bayerische Grenzpolizei (Bavarian Border Police), Hessen Grenzpolizei, and the separate Bundesgrenzschutz ("Federal Border Protection", now part of the Bundespolizei "Federal Police")

== Grepo in English language fiction ==
The word Grepo has been used in many Cold War spy novels. Possibly the first use was by Len Deighton in his 1964 book Funeral in Berlin.

== Similar terms ==
The related term Vopo (Volkspolizei) has also been used in English fiction. The abbreviation for the criminal police—Kripo—is less common in English texts.

== See also ==
- Bavarian Border Police
- Eastern Bloc politics
