= Border Troops =

Border Troops may refer to:

- Soviet Border Troops
- Border Troops of the German Democratic Republic
- Tajik Border Troops
- Border Troops of the State Security Service of Uzbekistan
- Border Protection Forces (Polish People's Republic)

== See also ==
- FSB Border Service of Russia, commonly known as border troops
- Border Guard (disambiguation)
- Border Patrol (disambiguation)
