= Bundesgrenzschutz =

Former federal law enforcement agency of Germany

Federal Border Guard Bundesgrenzschutz
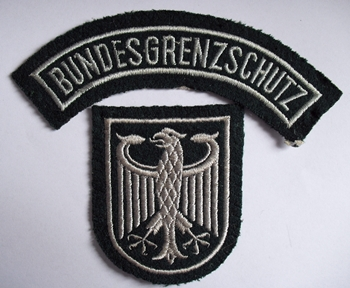
- BGS Federal Eagle (Bundesadler) worn from 1976 until 2001
- Abbreviation: BGS

Agency overview
- Formed: 16 March 1951 (renamed to Bundespolizei on 1 July 2005)
- Superseding agency: Federal Police
- Employees: 16,414 (1956); 38,000 (1999)
- Annual budget: DM 376 million (1970) € 1.942 billion (2004)

Jurisdictional structure
- Federal agency: Federal Republic of Germany
- Operations jurisdiction: Federal Republic of Germany
- General nature: Federal law enforcement; Gendarmerie
- Specialist jurisdiction: National border patrol, security, integrity

Operational structure
- Parent agency: Federal Ministry of the Interior

Notables
- People: Anton Grasser, for first inspector; Udo Burkholder, for last inspector

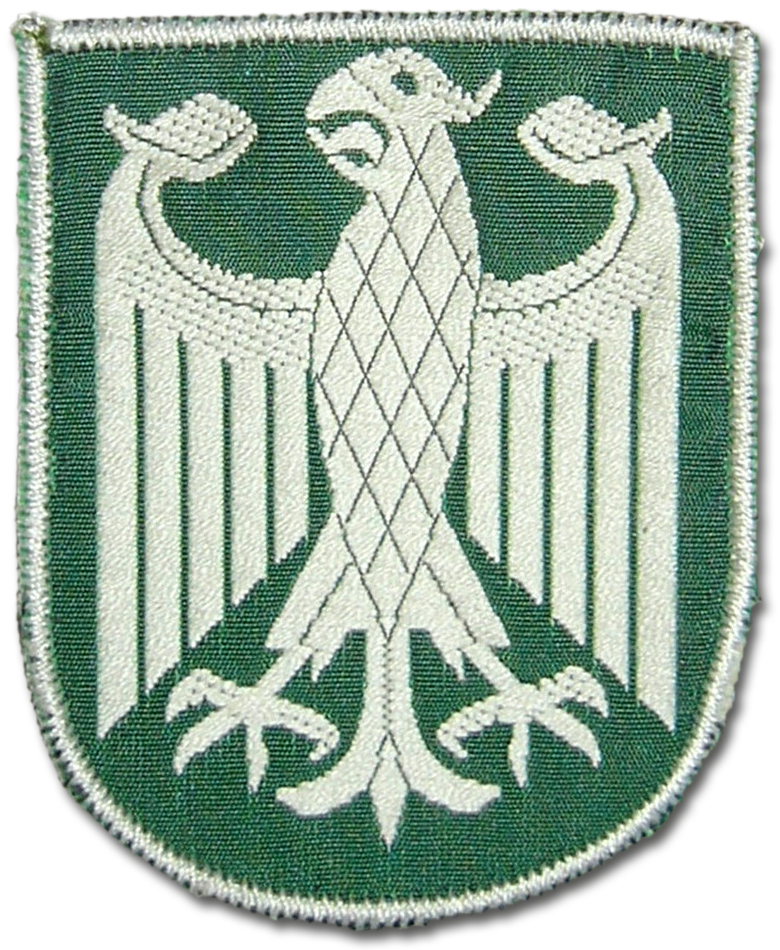
BGS Federal Eagle (Bundesadler) worn from 1952 until 1976

The Bundesgrenzschutz (German: [ˌbʊndəsˈɡʁɛnt͡sʃʊt͡s]; abbreviation: BGS, Federal Border Guard) was the federal border police force of the Federal Republic of Germany (West Germany), later renamed the Bundespolizei (Federal Police). Established on 16 March 1951 as a subordinate agency of the Federal Ministry of the Interior, the BGS originally focused on protecting the borders of West Germany, including its land and maritime frontiers. In its early years, BGS units had military structures, training, and equipment, and its law enforcement officers held legal military combatant status until 1994.

A significant portion of early BGS personnel transferred to the newly founded German Armed Forces (Bundeswehr) in 1956, contributing to West Germany's rearmament.

The Bundesgrenzschutz was renamed Bundespolizei on 1 July 2005. The change of name did not alter the agency's legal status or constitutional basis, but reflected its development into a multi‑faceted police force with responsibilities including land and maritime border protection, railway policing, and aviation security.

== History ==
After the Second World War, and under the conditions of Allied occupation, the newly formed Federal Republic of Germany sought to establish an independent federal border guard and police service. The Federal Border Guard Act (Bundesgrenzschutzgesetz) was adopted by the federal cabinet on 14 November 1950 and passed by the Bundestag on 15 February 1951.

The Cold War had begun, but travel between East and West Germany was not yet restricted by the Berlin Wall, which was erected in 1961. German nationals could move freely from the German Democratic Republic to the Federal Republic of Germany in Berlin, although individuals attempting to cross the inner-German border elsewhere were typically commercial smugglers or espionage agents carrying contraband such as radio transmitters. The Allied occupation authorities considered that these activities could be more effectively policed by a permanent German force familiar with the border terrain, and at German rather than Allied expense. The Bundesgrenzschutz was therefore organised along paramilitary lines in battalions, companies, and platoons, and equipped as light infantry. Despite this structure, it remained a police force under the authority of the Federal Ministry of the Interior rather than the Ministry of Defence.

A maritime border‑guard unit (Seegrenzschutz) was formed as part of the BGS on 1 July 1951. It consisted of approximately 550 members and was equipped with fourteen large patrol craft and several helicopters.

On 3 October 1953, the Bundespasskontrolldienst (federal passport control service), which had been established on 19 September 1951, was transferred to the BGS and was now deployed on the entire German border.

The BGS was initially a paramilitary force of 10,000, which was responsible for policing a zone 30 kilometres (19 mi) deep along the border. It eventually became the basis for the present national semi-militarised police force. On 19 June 1953 its authorized strength was expanded to 20,000 men, a mixture of conscripts and volunteers equipped with armoured cars, anti-tank guns, helicopters, trucks and jeeps. By 1956, it had a strength of 16,414 men. Upon the formation of the Bundeswehr in 1955, over 10,000 members of the BGS voluntarily joined the new German military in 1956. The Seegrenzschutz (Maritime Border Guard) was completely absorbed into the German Navy that year. A new maritime border guard unit was set up in the fall of 1964 as the Bundesgrenzschutz See (BGS See; BGS Sea).

Although it was not intended to be able to repel a full-scale invasion, the BGS was tasked with dealing with small-scale threats to the security of West Germany's borders, including the international borders as well as the inner German border. It had limited police powers within its zone of operations to enable it to deal with threats to the peace of the border. The BGS had a reputation for assertiveness, which made it especially unpopular with East Germans, who routinely criticized it as a reincarnation of the Zollgrenzschutz from the days of Nazi Germany. It also sustained a long-running feud with the Bundeszollverwaltung over which agency should have the lead responsibility for the inner German border.

The passing of the German Emergency Acts on 30 May 1968 relieved the BGS of its quasi-military tasks, as the Bundeswehr was now constitutionally permitted to operate domestically in clearly defined emergency situations—such as internal unrest, natural disasters, or major accidents—reducing the need for the BGS to fulfil military‑like roles. These provisions did not extend to counterterrorism, which remained the responsibility of civilian police forces (Landespolizei); the failure of the police response during the 1972 Munich Olympic attack subsequently led to the creation of the BGS's dedicated counterterrorism unit, GSG 9 (Grenzschutzgruppe 9). A military rank structure similar to that of the Bundeswehr was replaced in the mid-1970s by civil service-type personnel grades. The service uniform was green, but field units wore Sumpftarnmuster-type camouflage fatigues and, at times, M40/51 pattern steel helmets, and military training was still carried out.

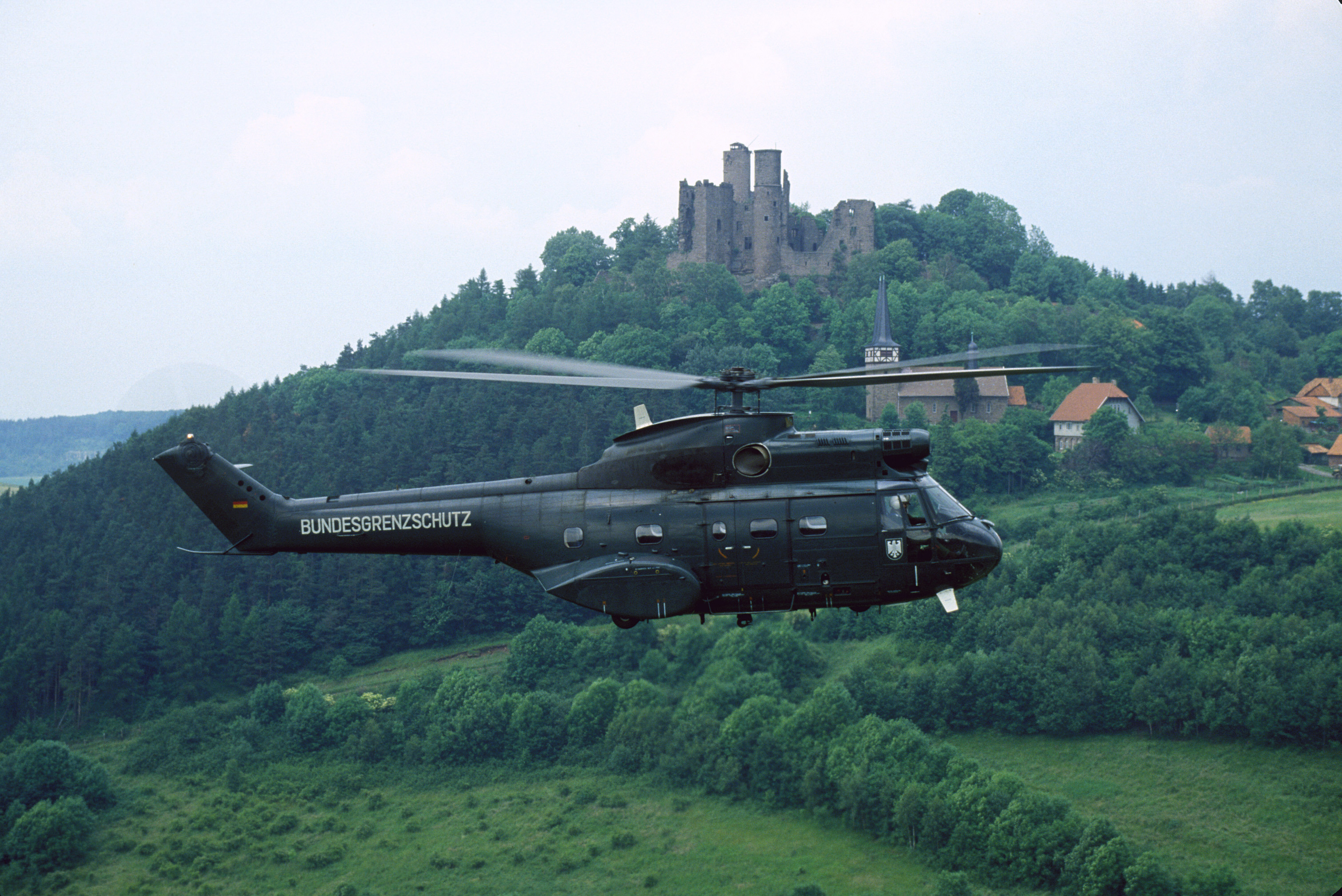
An Aerospatiale SA.330J Puma helicopter operated by the West German Bundesgrenzschutz in 1985

In 1972, the BGS became responsible for the security of the Federal Constitutional Court, the Bundespräsident (Federal President), the Bundeskanzler (Federal Chancellor), the Foreign Office, and the Federal Ministry of the Interior. In spring 1973, the Bundesgrenzschutz introduced the green beret as standard headgear for all of its officers. When GSG 9, the Bundesgrenzschutz's dedicated counterterrorism and special‑police unit, was established later that year, it adopted the same beret as part of its uniform.

Although the Compulsory Border Guard Service law is still in force, in 1974 the BGS became an all-volunteer enrollment force and in 1987 started recruiting women.

Among other things, it was equipped with armored cars, machine guns, automatic rifles, tear gas, hand grenades, rifle grenades, and antitank weapons. All personnel on border and security duty wore sidearms. Five units had light aircraft and helicopters to facilitate rapid access to remote border areas and for patrol and rescue missions. Some units were effectively Mountain troops because of their specialised training, equipment, and operational area (e.g., Bavarian Alps).

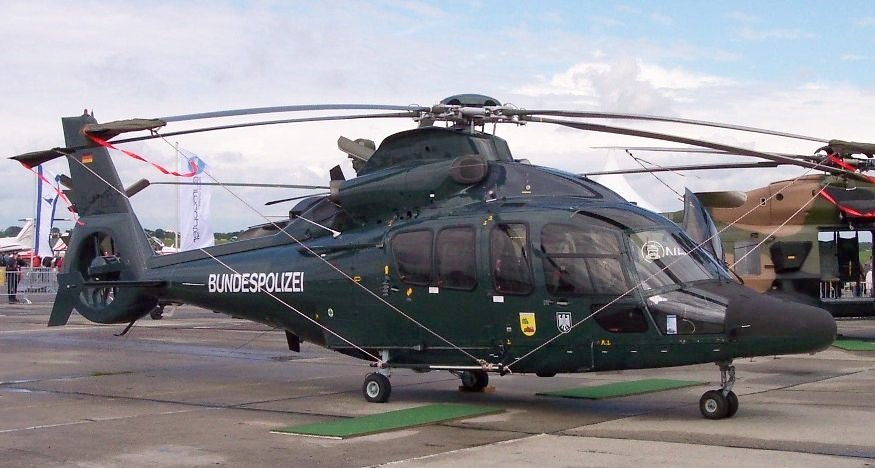
Former BGS Eurocopter EC 155 with current markings but BGS dark-green paint

In addition to controlling Germany's border, the BGS Alert police served as a federal reserve force to deal with major disturbances and other emergencies beyond the scope of the regional police. The BGS guarded airports and foreign embassies, and several highly trained detachments are available for special crises requiring demolition equipment, helicopters, or combat vehicles.

The BGS consisted of four border guard commands, which included a total of eight border guard groups: Grenzschutzgruppen (GSG) 1 through 7, along with a maritime unit. In 1972–73, the BGS established GSG 9, under its founder and first commander Ulrich Wegener, as a separate counterterrorism and hostage‑rescue unit independent of the existing border guard groups.

After shortcomings in regional state police procedures and training were revealed by the terrorist attack on Israeli athletes at the 1972 Summer Olympics, a BGS unit known as Border Guard Group 9 (Grenzschutzgruppe 9, GSG 9) was formed to deal with counter-terrorism incidents and hostage-rescue situations. The GSG 9 was not integrated into any of the existing groups. It gained international attention when it rescued the passengers and crew of the hijacked Lufthansa Flight 181 in Mogadishu, Somalia, in 1977.

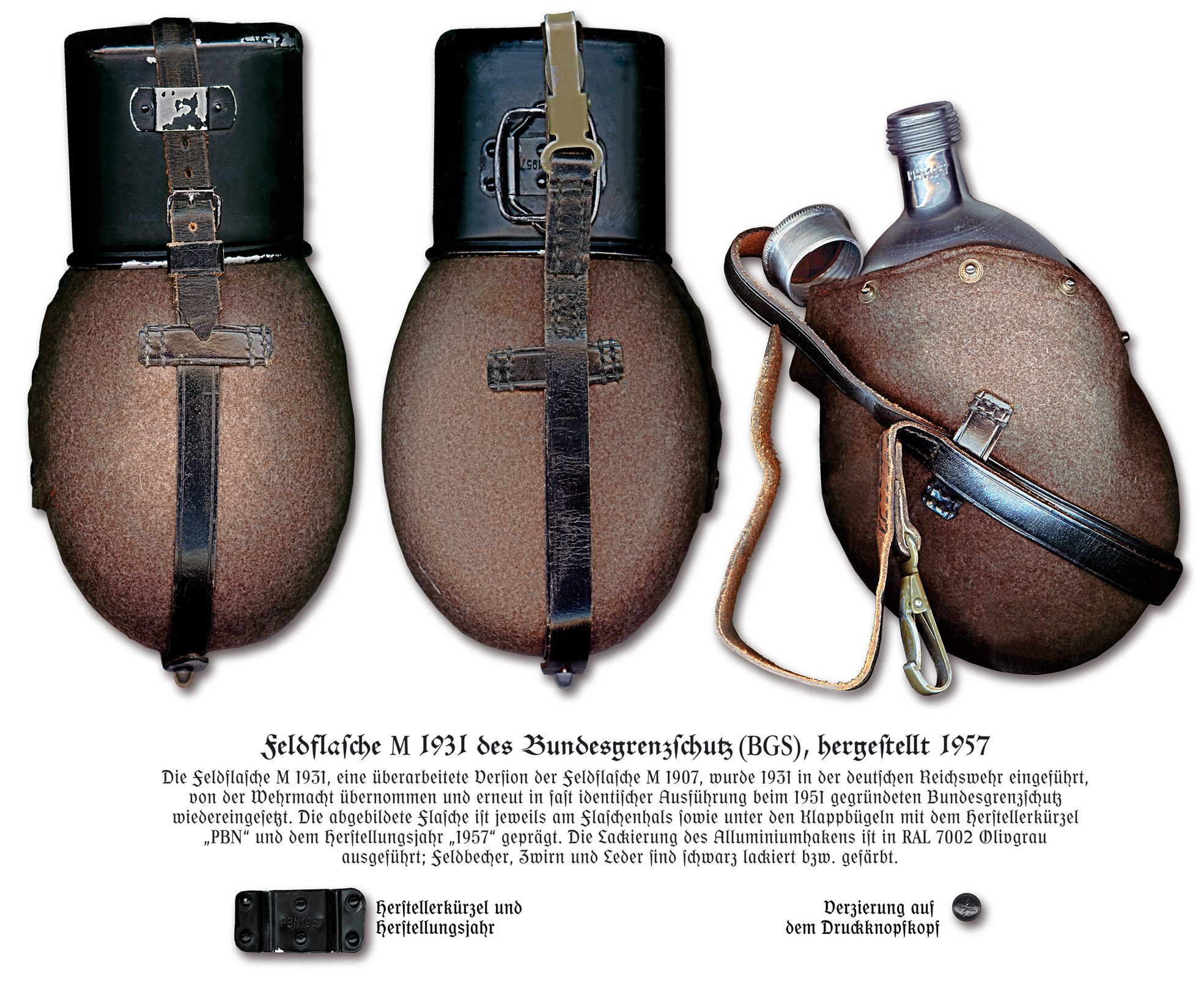
BGS canteen made in 1957

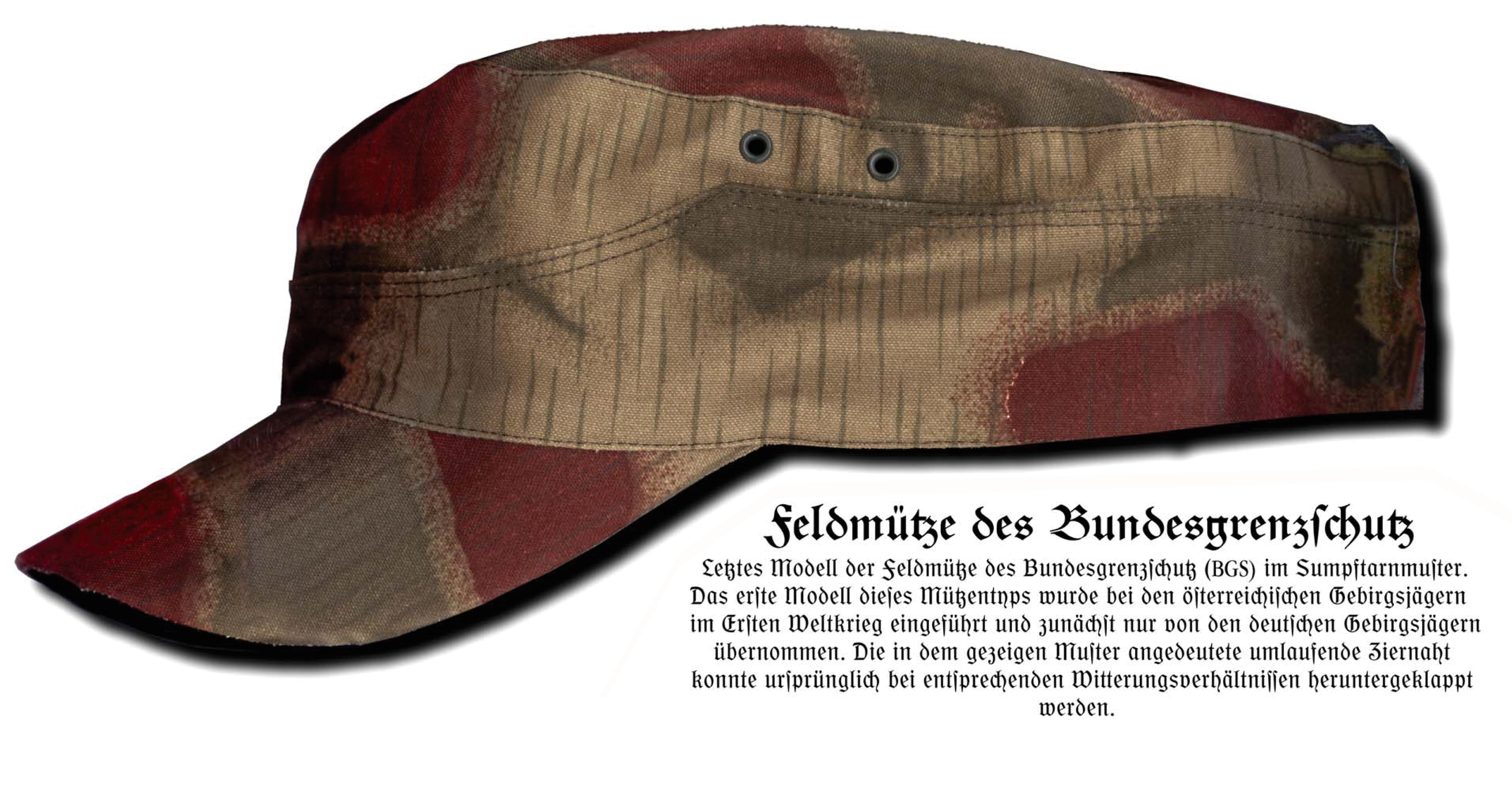
BGS Cap, in use until 1976

June 1990 saw the elimination of border patrols and controls at the Inner German border. Upon German reunification on 3 October 1990, the East German Transportpolizei duties, and responsibility for air security in the new federal states, were taken over by the BGS. The German Railway Police (Bahnpolizei), formerly an independent force, was restructured under the BGS on 1 April 1992 in preparation for the railway's privatization. The (formerly federally-run) railway system remains a federal competency, and Länder police forces have no authority over the railways.

The strength of the BGS was 24,000 in early 1995.

== Notable personnel ==
- Anton Grasser
- Kurt Andersen (general)
- Ulrich Wegener
- Michael Newrzella
- Willy Langkeit

== Weapons and equipment ==
=== Helicopters ===
- Aerospatiale Alouette II
- Aerospatiale SA 330 Puma
- Bell H-13 Sioux
- Bell UH-1 Iroquois
- Eurocopter EC155

== Gallery ==
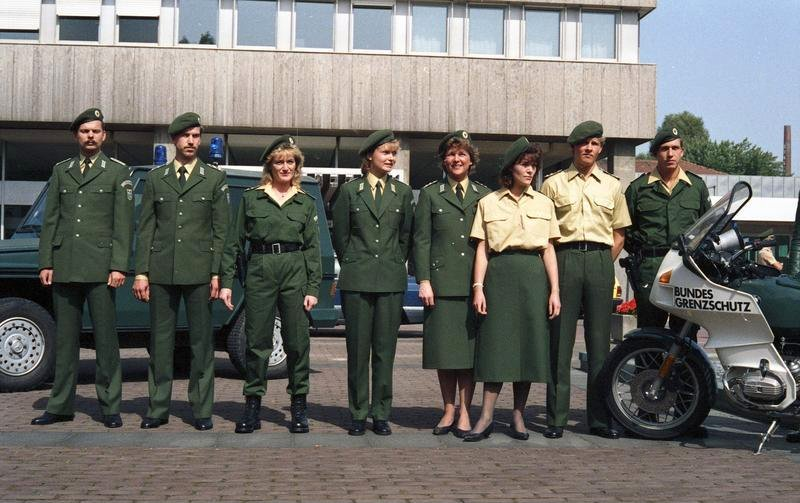
BGS uniforms c. 1987

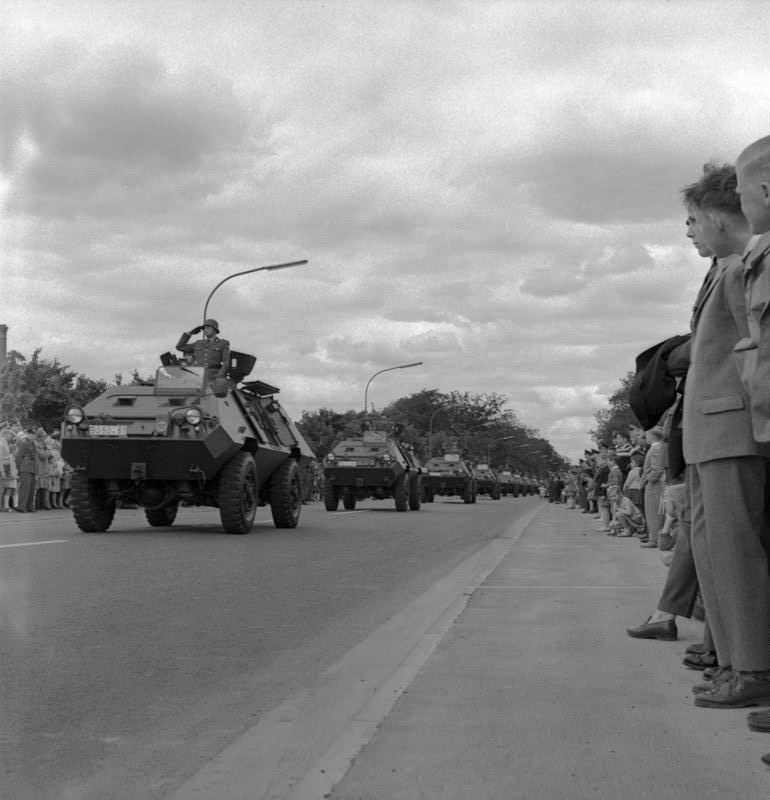
10th anniversary parade in Lübeck, 1961. Visible vehicles are Mowag MR 8s.

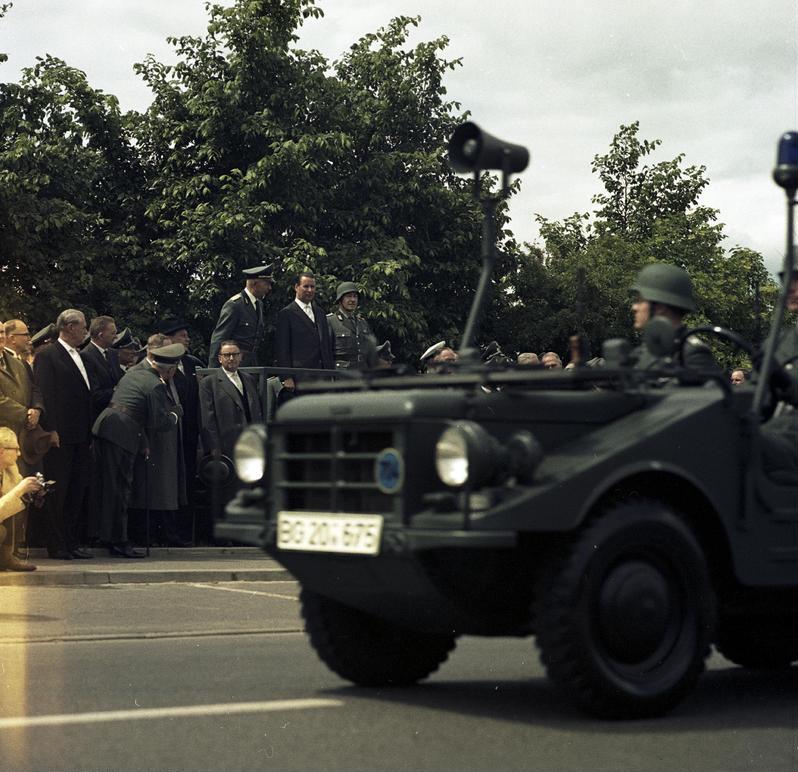
10th anniversary parade in Lübeck, 1961. The vehicle in the foreground is a DKW-Munga.

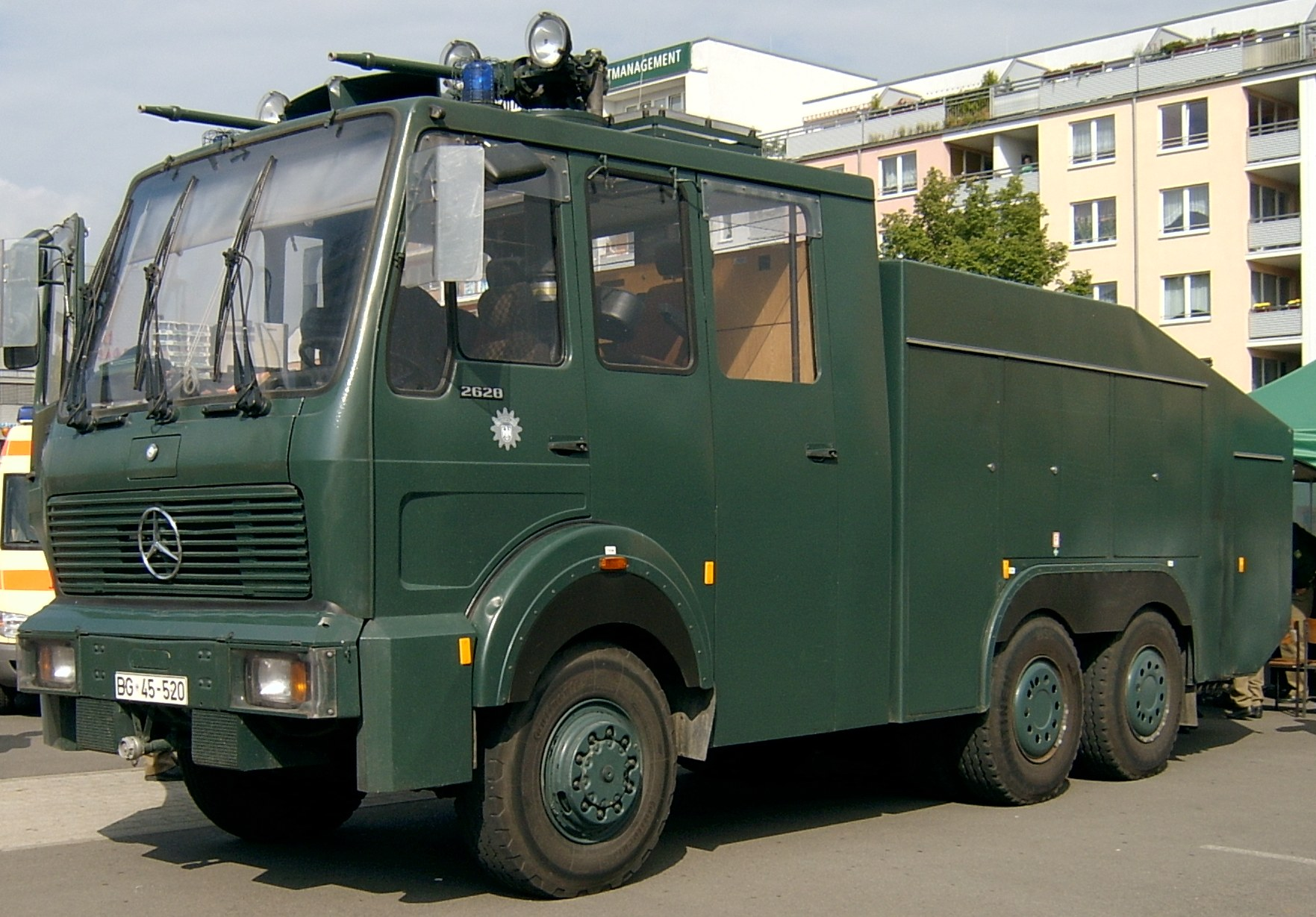
Water cannon [Mercedes-Benz NG 2628 WaWe 90002006-08], Frankfurt (Oder) 12

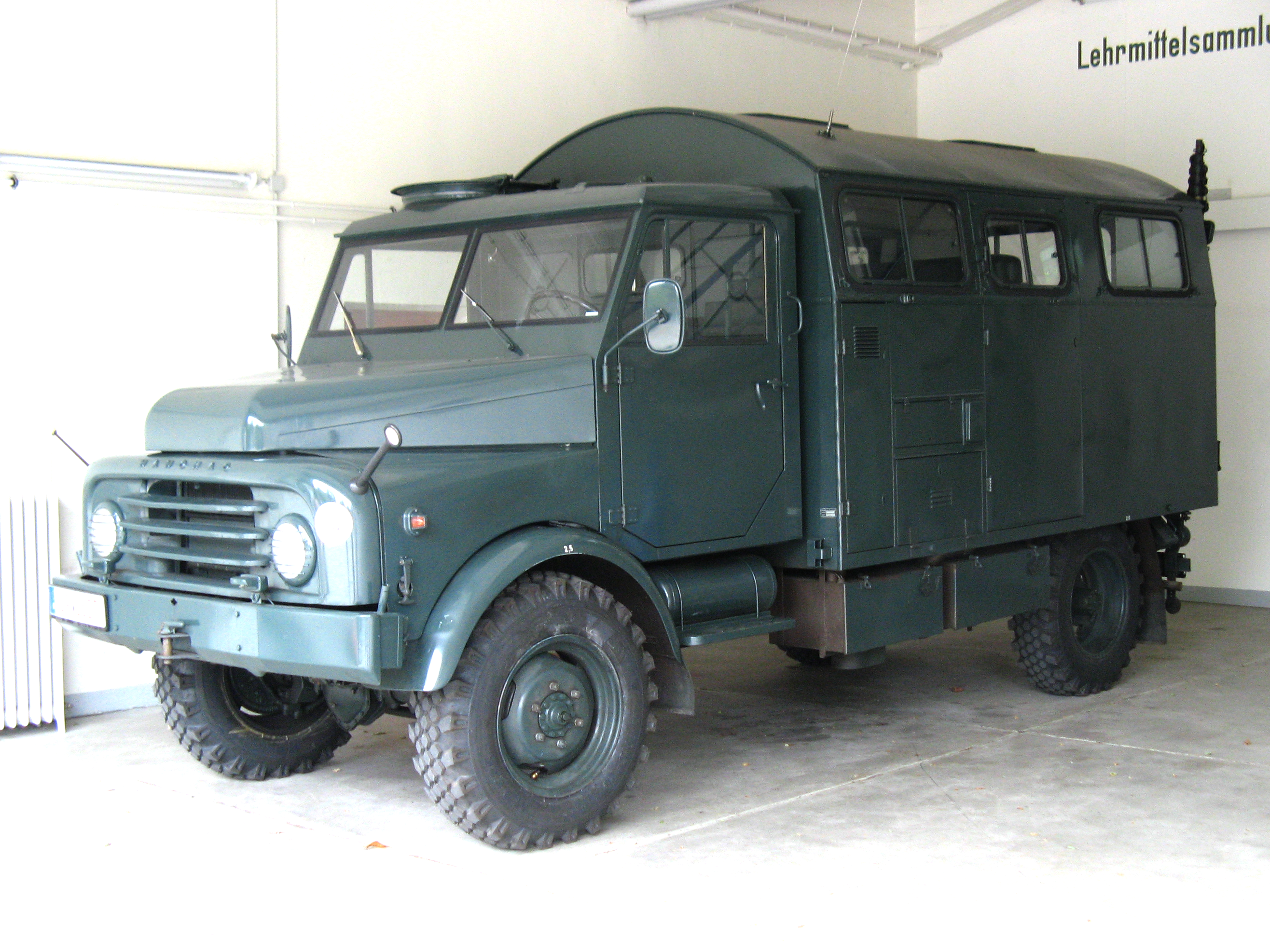
Hanomag AL-28 BGS Funkkraftwagen (Radio Car) L

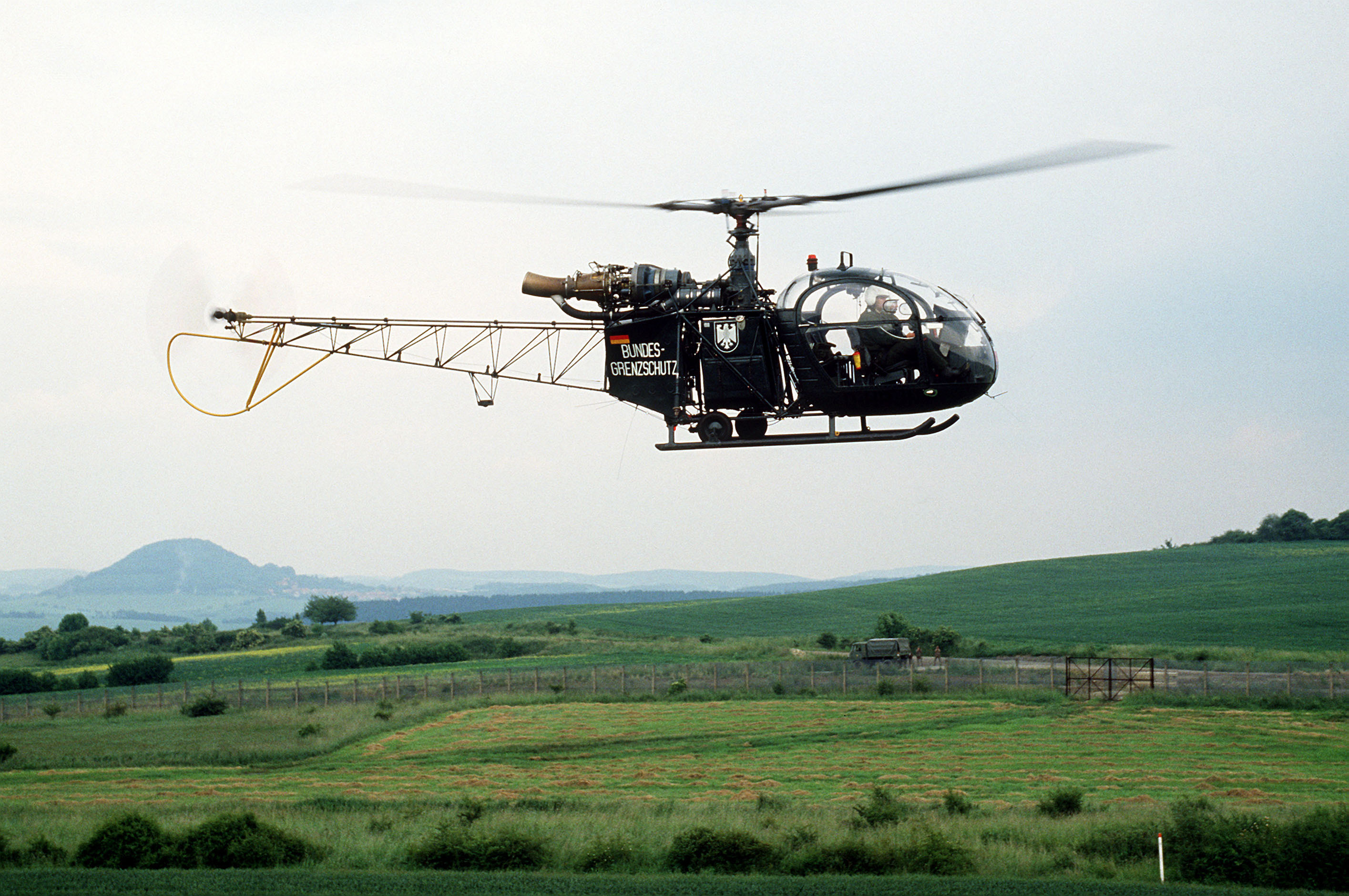
A Bundesgrenzschutz Alouette II helicopter patrols the West German side of the inner German border, 1985.

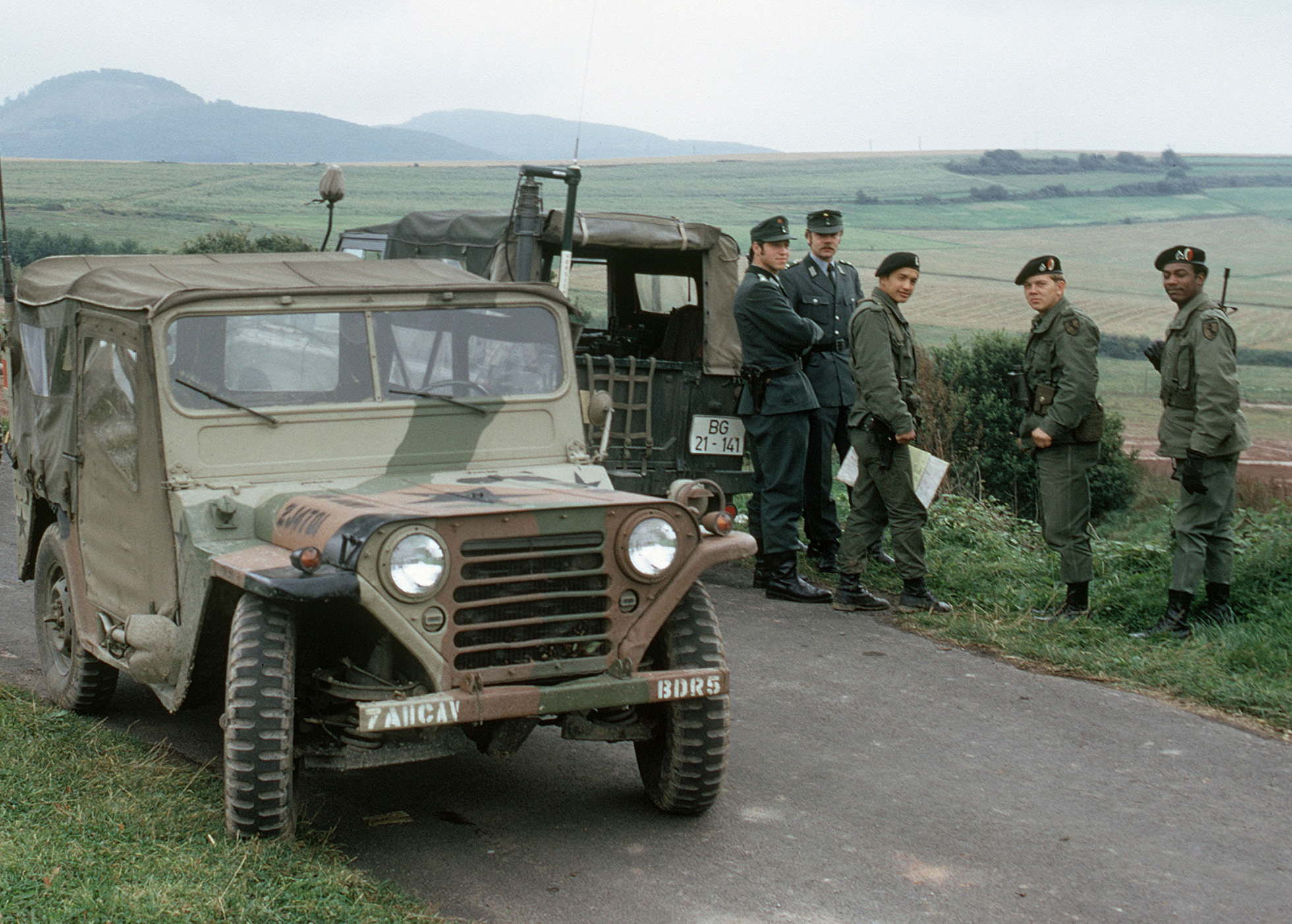
Members of the US Army's 11th Armored Cavalry stop to talk with West German border police while patrolling the border between East and West Germany in M151 light vehicles.

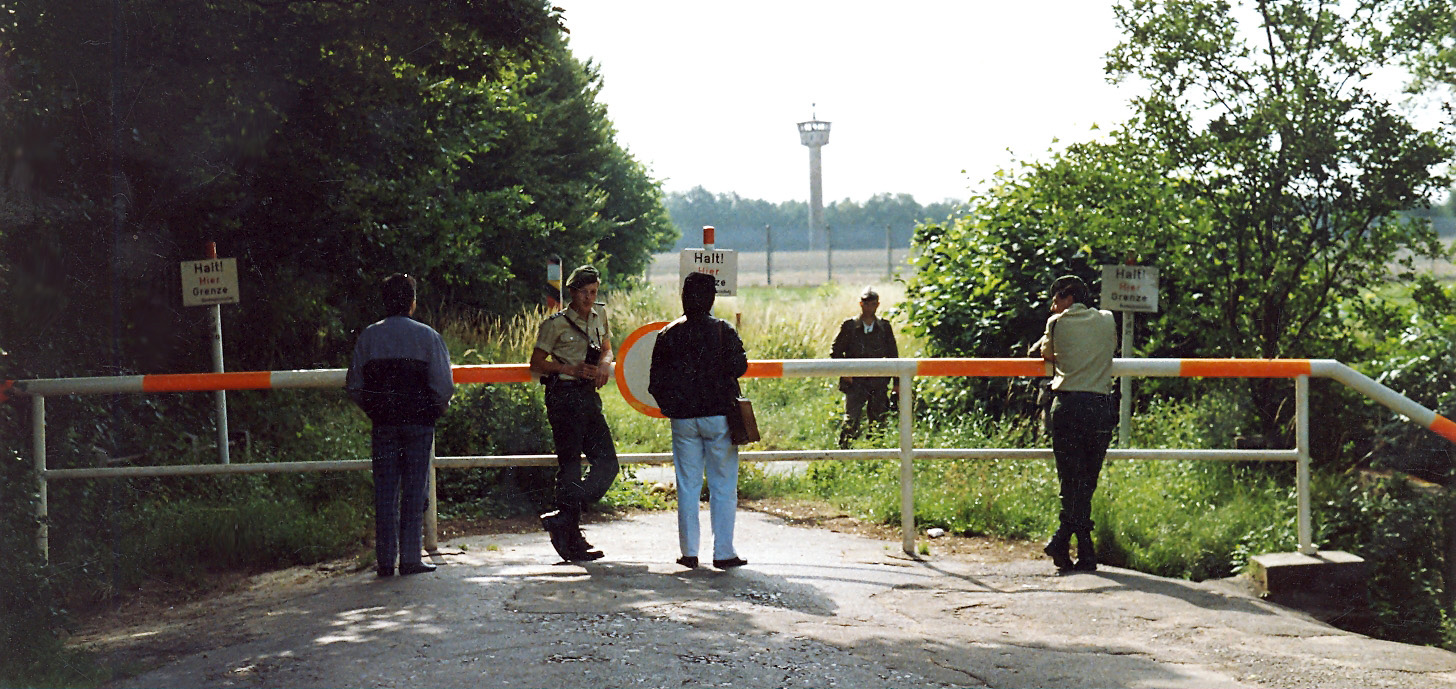
West German border guard, civilians and an East German border guard on opposite sides of the border line at Herrnburg near Lübeck.

== See also ==
- Allied-occupied Germany
- Bavarian Border Police
- B-Gendarmerie
- Border guards of the inner German border
- Border Troops of the German Democratic Republic
- British Frontier Service
- Bundeszollverwaltung (Federal Customs Service)
- Crossing the inner German border
- Development of the inner German border
- Escape attempts and victims of the inner German border
- Fall of the inner German border
- Fortifications of the inner German border
- Grepo
- Helmstedt–Marienborn border crossing (Checkpoint Alpha)
- United States Zone Constabulary
- Volkspolizei-Bereitschaft (East German Riot Police)
- Zollgrenzschutz

== Bibliography ==
- Tophoven, Rolf (1984). GSG 9: German response to terrorism. Bernard & Graefe Verlag. ISBN 978-3763750887.
