= Bavarian Border Police =

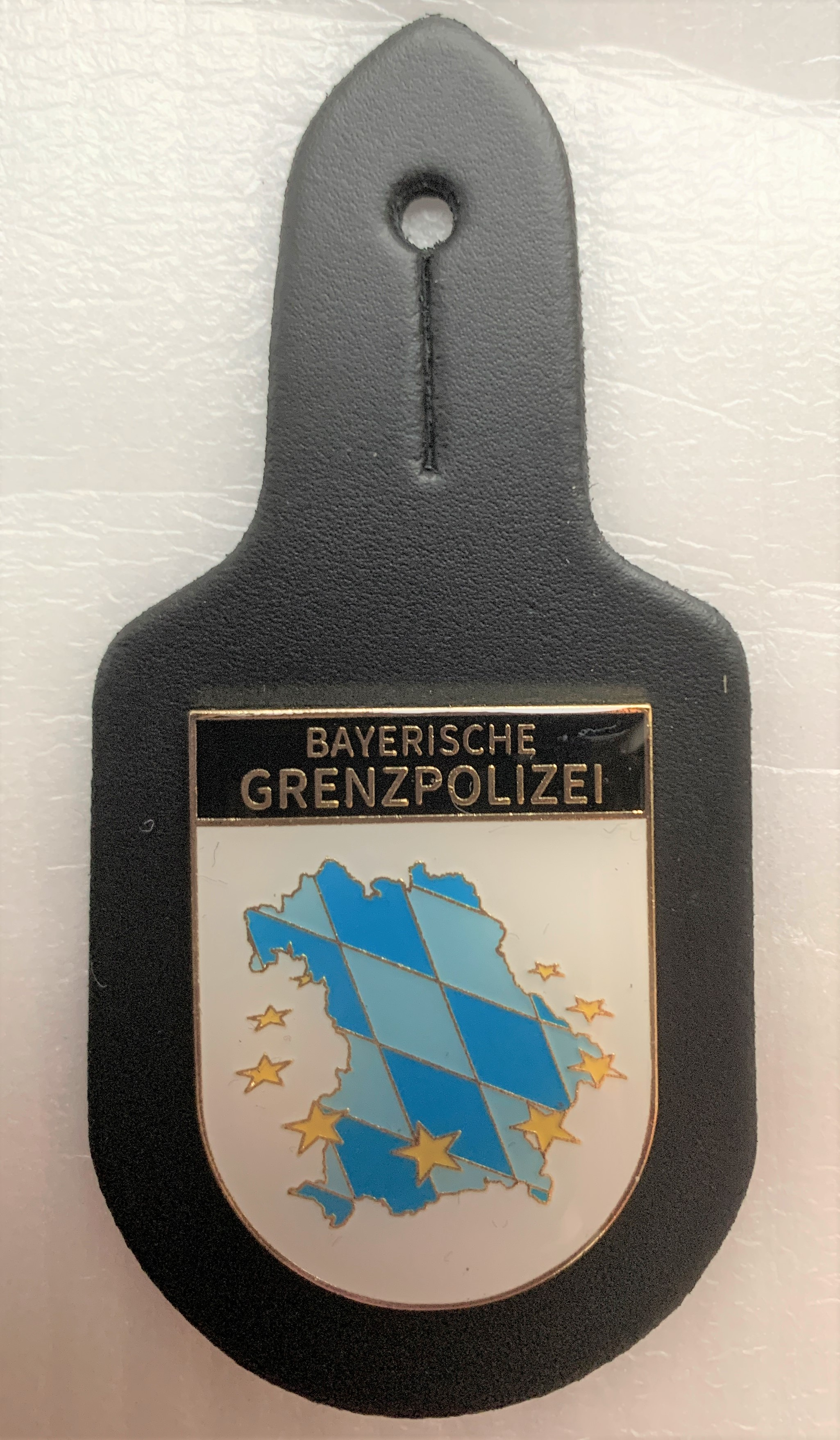
Badge of the Bavarian Border Police (chest medal)

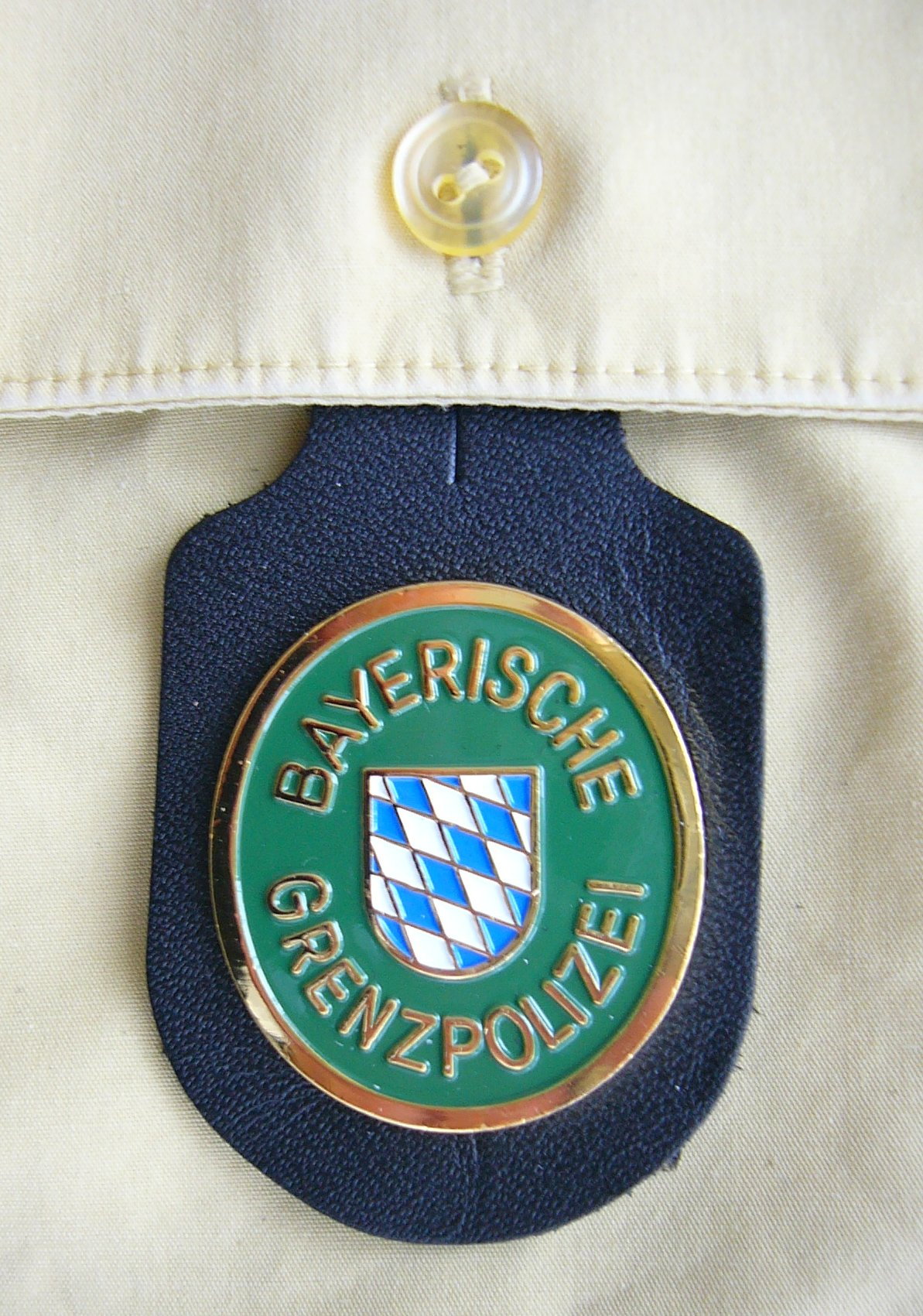
Former badge of the Bavarian Border Police (chest medal)

The Bavarian Border Police (German: Bayerische Grenzpolizei or GrePo) is a police division within the Bavarian State Police (Polizei Bayern). It is the third arm of the police force alongside the state police and the riot police (Bereitschaftspolizei). It existed from 1946 (independently from 1952) to 1998 and was responsible for the federal borders in Bavaria. It was re-established as an independent arm in 2018, having no responsibility for border control.

== History ==
In 1945 the Bavarian Border Police – then known as the Bavarian State Border Police (Bayerische Landesgrenzpolizei) – was reformed. The latter had existed from 1919 to 1934 in the shape of a Bavarian Border Police Commissariat on the borders between Lindau on Lake Constance and Eger. Its reformation was authorised by VA No. 72 on 15 November 1945 which established a Bavarian State Border Police force, the order taking effect from 1 March 1946. The first units were deployed by the American occupation powers as "Border Police".

On 15 March 1947, the overall responsibility for border control and implementation of Military Government Law No. 161 was transferred to the Bavarian Border Police. However, the border police continued to receive their orders from the Military Government. The responsibility for checking members of the allied military forces and their dependents was exclusively carried out by American military personnel.

On 28 October 1952, the Bavarian Police Organisation law was passed (Polizeiorganisationsgesetz). Articles 34 to 41 of this law governed the border police and their mission, which was: "the supervision and policing of the state borders, especially supervision of border traffic and carrying out the dispatch and reception of people, including the supervision of passengers at airports". Their departments were given descriptions that corresponded to those of the state police.

The last agreement over responsibilities vis-à-vis the Bundesgrenzschutz was spelt out by an administrative agreement, dated 16 July 1975, between the Interior Ministry and the Bavarian State Government, which dealt with the exercise of tasks by the border police arm of the police service in Bavaria.

The only other German state that had its own border police in the post-war era was Hesse, whose border force was operational on the Soviet, British and French zones from 1945 until 1 October 1950, when it was incorporated by the state police. Events in the late 1980s signalled the end of the Bavarian Border Police. Austria's entry into the EU on 1 January 1995 and on 28 April 1995 to the Schengen Treaty fundamentally changed the situation on the Bavarian-Austrian border.

From 1 January 1997, border controls on traffic from Austria were lifted in stages.

== 1998 Disbandment ==
With the incorporation of the Bavarian Border Police into the Bavarian State Police, their history came to an end on 31 March 1998. They were replaced by police departments that almost exclusively deal with cross-border traffic. These include: the Missing Persons Police Department (Polizeiinspektion Fahndung or PIF) with border police stations (GPS) and the Search and Inspection Force (Fahndungs- und Kontrolltrupp or FKT). FKT officials are civilian and also work outside Bavaria, in areas near the border. The border officers (Grenzbeauftragter) were the only vestige of the old border police that remained.

== Re-establishment in 2018 ==
Due to the European migrant crisis in 2015 and the establishment of border controls on the Austrian border, the state border police was re-established in 2018. The police force's headquarters are in Passau. The strength of the force will be approximately 1,000 officers.

== See also ==
- Grepo
- Law enforcement in Germany
- List of law enforcement agencies in Germany
