= Border Guard Service =

A Border Guard Service or State Border Guard Service may refer to:

- State Border Guard Service of Azerbaijan
- Border Guard Service of Belarus
- State Border Guard Service of Kyrgyzstan
- Lithuanian State Border Guard Service
- Border Guard Service of Russia
- State Border Guard Service of Ukraine
- State Border Service of Turkmenistan
- Border Guard (Poland)

== See also ==
- Border Guard (disambiguation)
