= Border Patrol =

Border Patrol may refer to:

- Border Patrol (New Zealand TV series), a 2004 New Zealand reality TV programme
- Border Patrol (American TV series), a 1959 syndicated TV series
- The Border Patrol (film), a 1928 film
- Border Patrol (1943 film), a Western
- Border Patrol (2001 film), an Australian-American supernatural action-thriller film
- The Shepherd: Border Patrol, a 2008 American action film
- United States Border Patrol, an American federal law enforcement organization

== See also ==
- Border Guard (disambiguation)
- Border Troops (disambiguation)
- Border guard
- Border control
- Border Force
- Border Patrol Police, in Thailand
