= Special forces of Serbia =

Special forces of the Serbian Armed Forces

There are two special forces units of Serbia (specijalne jedinice) as part of the Serbian Armed Forces.

Force	Branch
72nd Brigade for Special Operations	Armed Forces
63rd Parachute Brigade	Armed Forces
