= Border guard =

Government service concerned with security of national borders

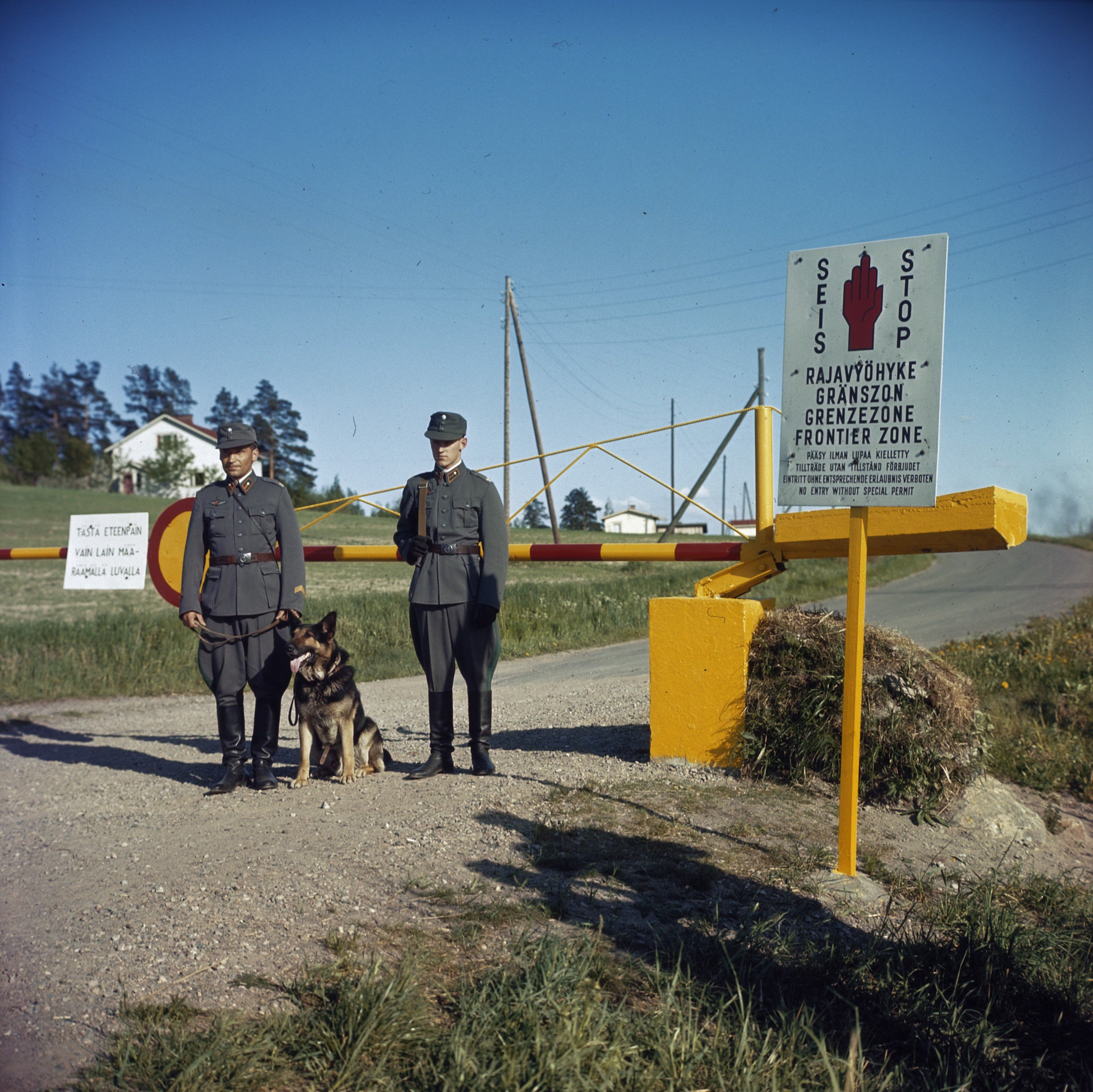
Finnish Border Guards in 1967

A border guard of a country is a national security agency that ensures border security. Some of the national border guard agencies also perform coast guard (as in Germany, Italy or Ukraine) and rescue service duties.

== Name and uniform ==
In different countries, names of particular border guard services vary significantly. The service may be called "police", "guard", "troops" or "sentinel" and the name would refer to the nation's official term for the state border - whether it is "frontier" or "border".

Most border guards of the world use dark green-colored elements on their uniform, insignia or flags.

== Tasks ==
=== Peacetime duties ===
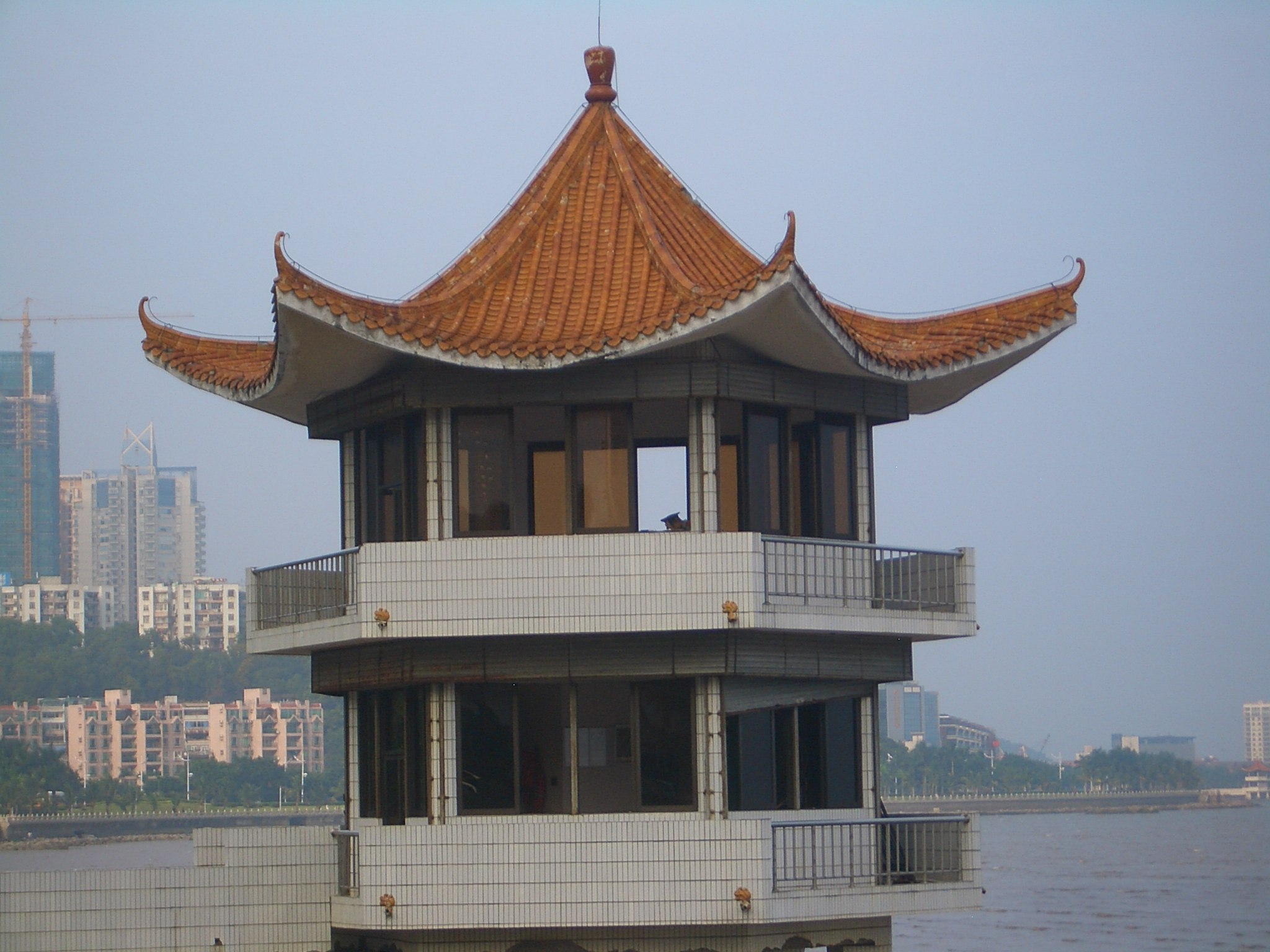
Chinese border guards' booth on the sea coast in Guangdong.

Typical tasks of a border guard are:

- Controlling and guarding a nation's borders and protecting national borders;
- Controlling border crossing persons, vehicles, and travel documents;
- Preventing illegal border crossing of persons, vehicles, cargoes and other goods;
- Controlling transportation of prohibited and limited items (e.g. weapons, ammunition, toxic substances, narcotics) over the national border;
- Supervising and controlling the observation of foreigner residence regulations, visa regime;
- Preventing the illegal movement of goods and other art across the nation's borders, bypassing customs control;
- Investigating cases related to offenses against the national border.
- Systematic and permanent observation of the state border space, from land, sea or air, by visual, electronic or other modern means of surveillance and protection, with the purpose of detecting, alerting and / or preventing possible violations in the international limit; It also involves verification and reporting on the maintenance and conservation of border markers.
- Prevent criminals, escapees from prisons or fugitives from the internal justice of the country evade and flee to other nations to evade the action of national justice
- Exchange all types of information and cooperate with other national agencies and counterparts in other countries, as well as with international organizations specializing in migration, border control, customs control, sanitary control, phytosanitary control and security to assist in the implementation of actions against the illicit trafficking of migrants, trafficking in persons, crimes related to transnational organized crime, terrorism, illegal trafficking in arms and explosives, corruption, drug trafficking and against the diversion, for illegal purposes, of dual-use goods and other activities related
- Immigration control duties.
- The border guard may also perform customs.

=== Wartime duties ===
During wartime more militarized border guard services may be transferred to be under the control of a country's armed forces branches, if it is not so already.

== Border guards by country ==
=== Australia ===
The Australian Border Force (ABF), is a part of the Department of Home Affairs, responsible for offshore and onshore border control enforcement, investigations, compliance and detention operations in Australia. The Force was established on 1 July 2015 merging the Australian Customs and Border Protection Service with the immigration detention and compliance functions of the then Department of Immigration and Border Protection.

The ABF is a law enforcement agency operating under the Australian Border Force Act 2015 with broadened legislative powers including the introduction of sworn officers. A new uniform was introduced and following the transition there was increase in the number of officers authorised to carry firearms.

=== Bangladesh ===
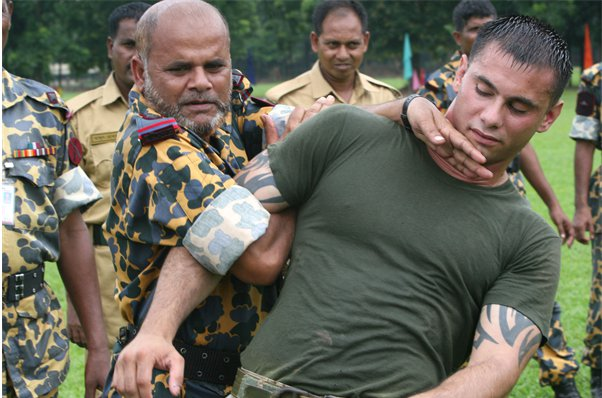
A Bangladesh Rifles (now Border Guard Bangladesh) Senior Warrant Officer (left in yellow/green outfit) applies a mechanical advantage control/hold to a US Marine during training.

Border Guard Bangladesh (BGB) is a paramilitary border security and anti-smuggling force under the Ministry of Home Affairs of Bangladesh. BGB can trace back its origin to the establishment of the Ramgarh Local Battalion in 1795. This force is armed and although its primary duty is to protect the border, during national emergencies it can also be called upon to aid the government.

=== Canada ===
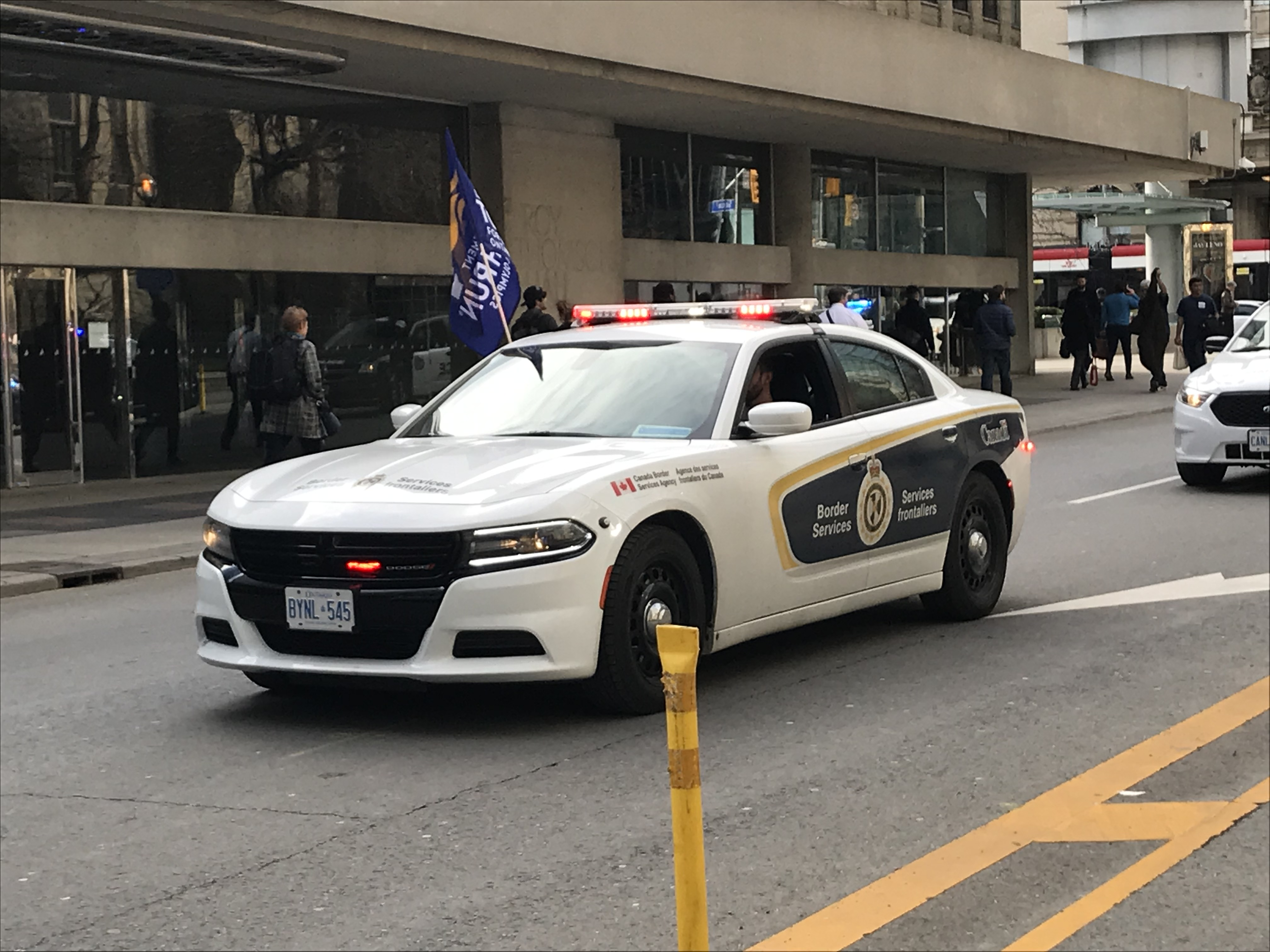
CBSA Inland Enforcement Officers

Canada Border Services Agency (CBSA) is a law enforcement agency of the Department of Public Safety and Emergency Preparedness. Created in 2003, it amalgamated the enforcement activities performed by three separate government entities (Canada Customs and Revenue Agency, Citizenship and Immigration Canada and the Canadian Food Inspection Agency). Traditionally unarmed, the arming of Border Services Officers, Investigators, and Inland Enforcement Officers began in 2007 and was completed in 2016. Officers are found at entry points to Canada (airports, marine entry points, and land border crossing points with the United States).

=== Czech Republic ===
Alien Police Service is a highly specialized unit of the Police of the Czech Republic, which carries out functions relating to the detection of illegal migration, application of punitive measures against foreigners staying in the Czech Republic in violation of the law no. 326/1999 Coll. On the residence of foreigners in the Czech Republic and amending certain laws, as amended laws, the tasks arising from international agreements and directly applicable European Community legislation and solving the crimes committed in connection with the crossing of the state border and cross-border crime. The Alien Police Service was established by the Ministry of the Interior no. 67/2008 establishing units of the Police of the Czech Republic nationwide.

Alien Police of the Czech Republic is divided into:

Alien Police Service Directorate - is within the specified range managing, methodological and control department with jurisdiction throughout the Czech Republic and is directly subordinate to the Police Presidium of the Czech Republic

Alien Police Unions in the regional directorates of individual regions

- Department of residence controls, search and escort
- Department of residence matters
- Department documents and specialized activities
- Documentation Department
- Department of International Relations (only in border areas)

=== Egypt ===
The Border Guard Corps is under the control of the Ministry of Defence. The Border Guard is a lightly armed paramilitary unit of about 25,000 personnel, responsible for border surveillance, general peacekeeping, drug interdiction, and prevention of smuggling. During the late 1980s, the force was equipped with remote sensors, night-vision binoculars, communications vehicles, and high-speed motorboats.

=== Finland ===
The Finnish Border Guard (Finnish: Rajavartiolaitos; Swedish: Gränsbevakningsväsendet), including the coast guard, is the agency responsible for border control related to persons, including passport control and border patrol. The Border Guard is a paramilitary organization, subordinate to the Ministry of the Interior in administrative issues and to the President of the Republic in issues pertaining to the president's authority as Commander-in-Chief (e.g. officer promotions). The Finland-Russia border is a controlled border, routinely patrolled and protected by a border zone enforced by the Border Guard. Borders to Norway and Sweden are open borders, but the Border Guard maintains personnel in the area owing to its search and rescue (SAR) duties. There are two coast guard districts for patrolling maritime borders. The Border Guard has also detachments posted at ports and airports. In peacetime, the Border Guard trains special forces and light infantry and can be incorporated fully or in part into the Finnish Defence Forces when required by defence readiness. The Border Guard has police and investigative powers in immigration matters and can independently investigate immigration violations. The Border Guard has search and rescue (SAR) duties, both maritime and inland. The Guard operates SAR helicopters that are often used in inland SAR, in assistance of a local fire and rescue department or other authorities. The Border Guard shares border control duties with Finnish Customs, which inspects arriving goods, and the Finnish Police, which enforces immigration decisions such as removal.

=== France ===
The French Direction générale des douanes et droits indirects, Directorate-General of Customs and Indirect Taxes is a law enforcement civilian agency responsible for levying indirect taxes, preventing smuggling, surveilling borders and investigating counterfeit money. The agency acts as a coast guard, border guard, sea rescue organisation and a customs service. Though it is a civilian service, agents are armed. In France, it is commonly known as "les douanes", which means customs ("la douane" is a border checkpoint). Agents are referred to as "douaniers", which means customs officers. In the French legal standards, the prosecution carries the burden of proof since the defendant is presumed innocent; but in customs procedures, the defendant carries the burden of proof.

French Border Police, Police aux frontières or PAF (former Police de l'air et des frontières), also have to monitor the borders and conduct checks in some parts.

=== Germany ===
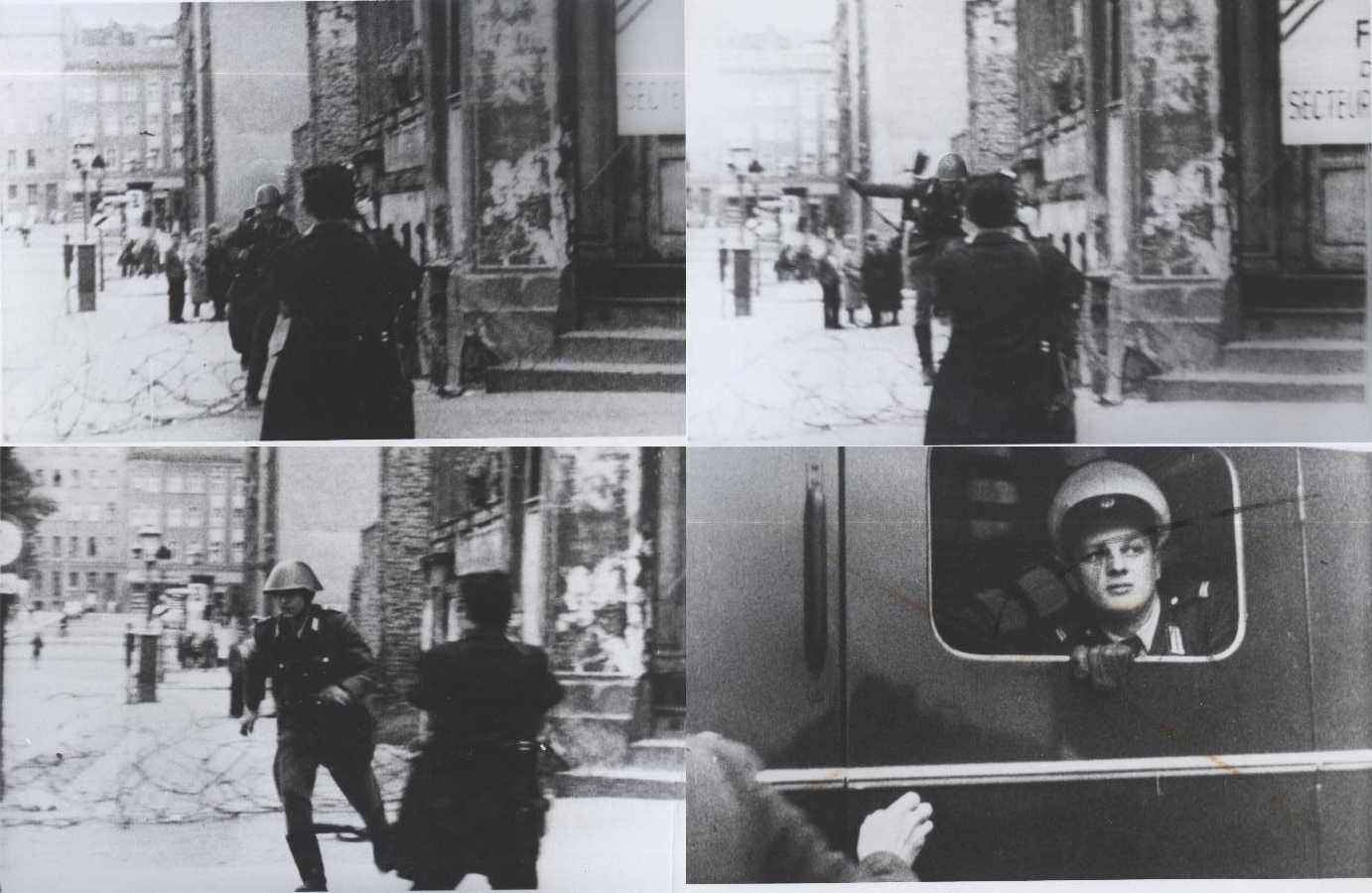
East German border guard Konrad Schumann jumping the border in 1961

In Germany, the Federal Police (Bundespolizei), a civilian agency subordinated to the Federal Ministry of the Interior, is - besides other duties - responsible for border control tasks. Until 2005, the Federal Police was called Federal Border Guard, and originally was a paramilitary organisation having mandatory service in the 1970s, but had its military rank structure changed into a civilian one in the 1970s and lost its wartime combatant status in the 1990s.

==== State Border Guard ====
The German state of Bavaria reestablished its State Border Police in the aftermath of the European migrant crisis in 2018 again, after it was merged into the Bavarian State Police in 1998 because of the Schengen Agreement.

=== Ghana ===
In October 1964, the Border Guard Unit was formed as a police unit led by an assistant commissioner of police. The BGU acted as customs agents examining passengers and baggage aboard ships and aircraft. It forms part of the Ghana Revenue Authority. The primary operation of BGU is the detection and apprehension of illegal aliens as well as smugglers of aliens at or near the land borders.

=== Hong Kong ===
Border guards in Hong Kong consists of two civilian agencies:

- Customs and Excise officers handling customs duties at ports, airports and land crossing.
- Immigration officers handle people entering ports, airport (1) and land crossings (6) with mainland China.

Hong Kong Police Force officers patrol the border with mainland China, but they are not border guards at entry points. Prior to 1995, this role was performed by British Army units stationed in Hong Kong.

Various police checkpoint booths (boundary crossing) are found along roads and are in the outside Closed Areas. Staffed by uniformed Hong Kong Police officers, vehicle occupants must present papers and/or permits in order to proceed to the border. These officers act as informal border guards, which do not exist in Hong Kong as there is no international boundary with mainland China.

All three border agencies are responsibilities of the Security Bureau.

=== Hungary ===
In Hungary, border control has belonged to the Hungarian Police (Rendőrség) since 2007. There is no different organization for this role. Policemen serving on the border have the very same uniform as those inside the country. Previously the Frontier Guard or Border Guard was a separate agency.

=== Kyrgyzstan ===
The Border Guard Service of the State Committee for National Security of the Kyrgyz Republic are responsible for the border security of Kyrgyzstan. The Border Guard Service is commanded by the Ministry of Internal Affairs, but are officially part of the Armed Forces of the Kyrgyz Republic. They had many disagreements with the Border Troops of the State Security Service of Uzbekistan and had a military drill with China in August 2013.

=== India ===
The Border Security Force (BSF) is India's largest border patrol agency and is the largest border guarding force of the world. Established in December 1965 in the aftermath of the Second Indo Pakistani War after the Central Reserve Police Force, the Rajasthan Armed Constabulary and the Punjab Armed Police were relieved from their duties of guarding the Indo-Pakistani Border in the regions of Jammu and Kashmir, Rajasthan and Punjab respectively. It is a component of the Central Armed Police Forces (CAPFs). It has been guarding the India-Pakistan Border since 1965 and the Indo-Bangladeshi Border since 1971, when the Bangladesh gained independence after Bangladesh Liberation War. The BSF is controlled by the Ministry of Home Affairs and is headed by an Indian Police Service Officer.

The Indo-Tibetan Border Police (ITBP) is an Indian border patrol force conceived on October 24, 1962, which is responsible for patrolling India's 2115 kilometer border with the Tibet Autonomous Region of China. Although it previously patrolled the borders with the help of the Assam Rifles it has been the sole border patrol agency for the entire border since 2002 when it took over the border guarding responsibilities from Assam Rifles in the states of Arunachal Pradesh and Sikkim.Like the BSF it is also a Central Armed Police Force controlled by the Ministry of Home Affairs.

The Central Armed Police Force, Sashastra Seema Bal (SSB) guards the India–Nepal border and the Bhutan–India border.

The Assam Rifles (AR) is another Central Armed Police Force tasked which has border patrol duties. It is tasked with guarding the India–Myanmar border.The Assam Rifles is also controlled by the Ministry of Home Affairs, however the operational control of the AR is exercised by the Indian Army.

=== Indonesia ===
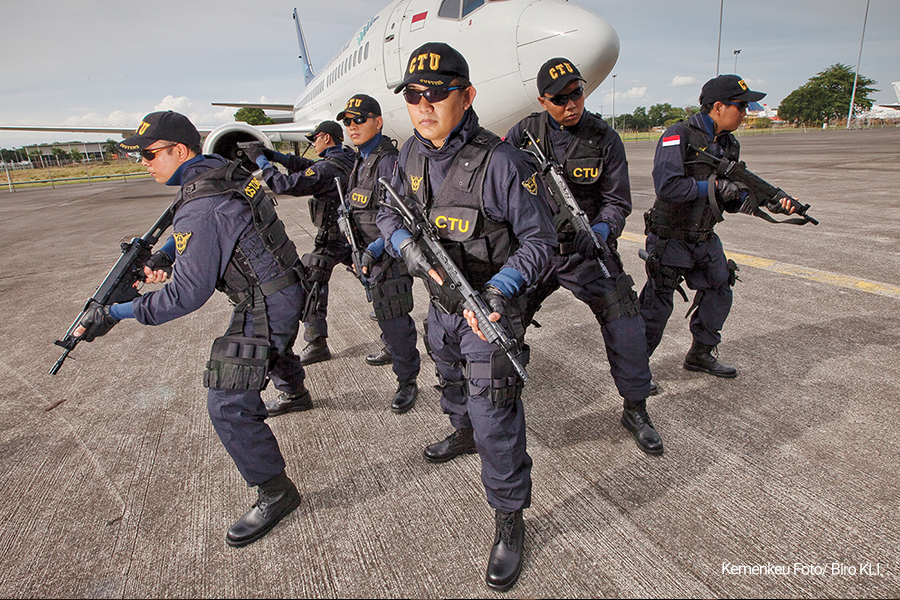
Indonesian Customs officers from the "Customs Tactical Unit" (CTU)

Border security in Indonesia are conducted:

- At seaports, airports and land crossings :
  Customs officers oversee traffic of goods and Immigration officers oversee traffic of people.
- At land borders :
  To defend, guard and patrol the land borders of Indonesia with Malaysia (at Borneo), East Timor, and Papua New Guinea which are mainly within dense forest and mountainous terrains is conducted by the "Border Patrol Task Force" (Satuan Tugas Pengamanan Perbatasan abbreviated Satgas Pamtas), which are tasked to the Indonesian Army Infantry battalions.
- At sea borders :
  Guarding and Patrolling of sea borders are conducted by joint-operation between Maritime Security Agency, Navy, Coast Guard, Maritime Police, Marine and Fisheries Resources Surveillance and Marine Customs.

=== Iran ===
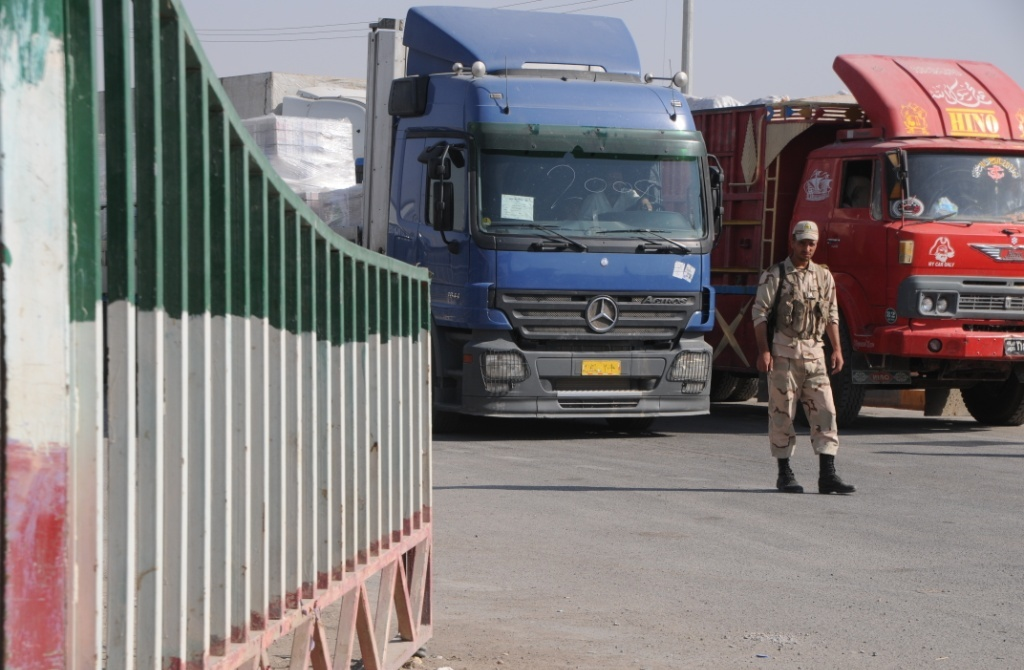
An Iranian border guard supervising trucks entering "Shalamsha Port of Entry" in Iran–Iraq border

The Islamic Republic of Iran Border Guard Command is the sole agency responsible for border patrol and control, acting under Law Enforcement Force (which itself is part of Armed Forces of Iran) since 2000. The agency also has coast guard duties in maritime borders. The control of entry points in airports are conducted by Islamic Revolutionary Guard Corps.

=== Israel ===
The Israel Border Police operates as a gendarmerie under the supervision of the Israel Police and was founded as part of the frontier corps before it became the Border Police.

=== Italy ===
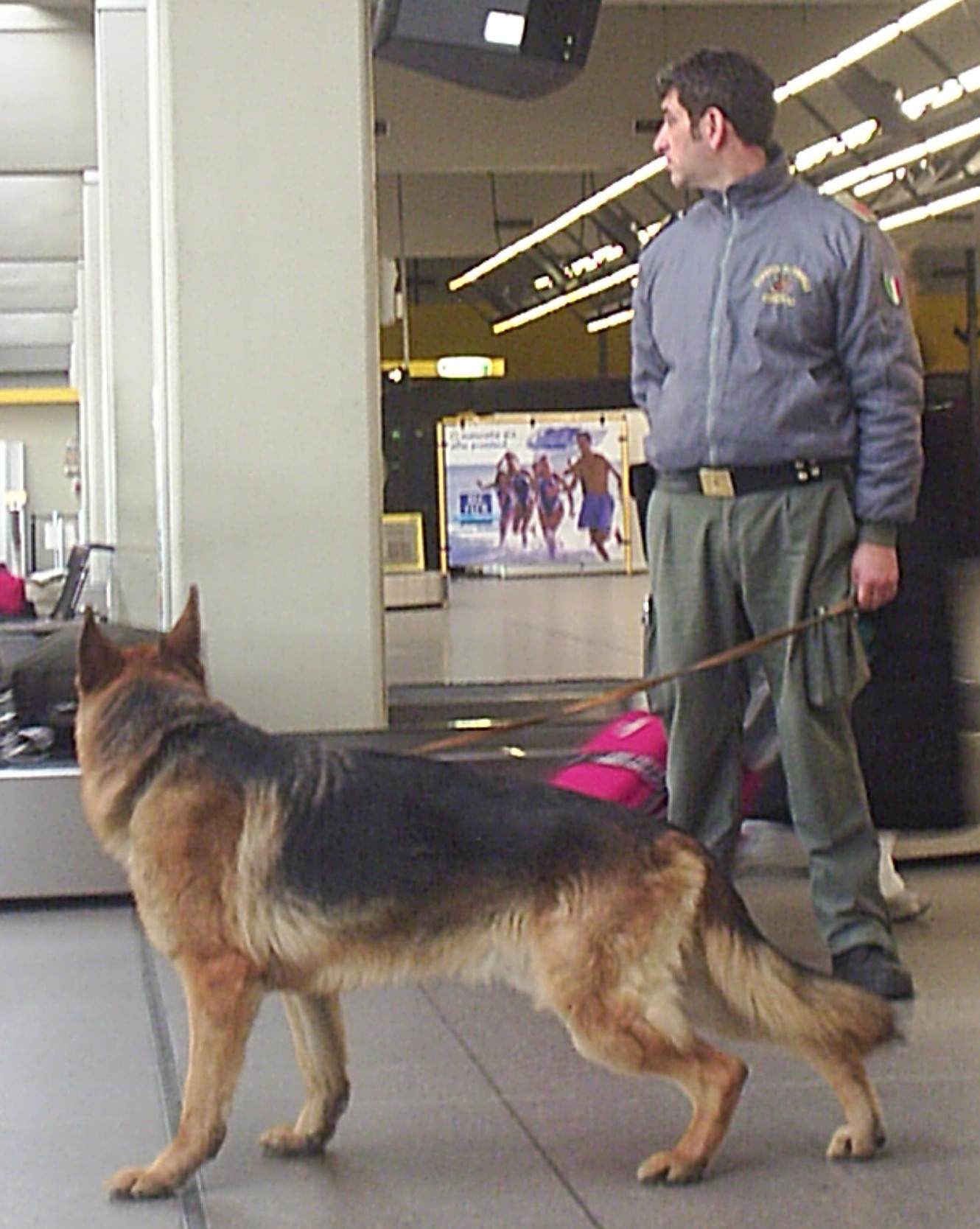
Italian Guardia di Finanza K9 unit at Malpensa airport.

In Italy the border police service is covered by the Guardia di Finanza, part of the Italian Armed Forces but under the operational control of the Finance Minister for its law enforcement duties; but there is also the Italian Customs Agency, a civilian administration that have the role of Customs Authority. Mostly, the Guardia di Finanza (or Fiamme Gialle) fight against smuggling, illegal drug trafficking, tax evasion and other financial crimes, even jointly to the Customs Agency. The Immigration and Border Police also performs passport checks.

=== Latvia ===
In Latvia the State Border Guard is in charge of protecting the border of the country. The armed organization is subordinate to the Ministry of the Interior.

=== Lithuania ===
The State Border Guard Service is the organisation charged with controlling and maintaining the Lithuanian Border. The State Border Guard Service falls under authority of the Ministry of the Interior, which supervises and controls the implementation of border guard policy.

=== Macau ===
Border patrol and immigration control in Macau are conducted by Public Security Police Force of Macau at land entries (4) with China and at Macau International Airport. Customs duties are performed by Macau Customs agency. Both border guards and customs officers are responsibilities of the Secretariat for Security.

=== Malaysia ===
Immigration Department is part of the Malaysian government agency that was recently established in 2015 to guard the country's entry and exit points from illegal activities such as smuggling, illegal migration and human trafficking. Before the establishment of the agency, Malaysian borders was guarded by the Malaysian Armed Forces and Malaysian Maritime Enforcement Agency.

=== Myanmar ===
Myanmar has a complex border security system. The Border Guard Forces (BGF) are former ethnic armed organisations or EAOs that have either defected/surrendered to the Tatmadaw or are EAOs that have chosen to give up autonomy for formal integration. These BGF units function more as light infantry units for the Tatmadaw. A force that officially does handle border protection duties is the Border Guard Police (BGP), a specialized department of the Myanmar Police Force (MPF). The Ministry of Immigration and Population is also charged with some duties similar to border protection. In addition, the Myanmar Coast Guard (MCG) has maritime border security duties. The Ministry of Border Affairs is also responsible for border development and security and as it is one of the three ministries whose minister is appointed by the Commander-in-Chief of Defence Services, the ministry plays an integral role in Myanmar's border security and defence.

=== Netherlands ===
The Royal Marechaussee is the fourth organization within the Netherlands Armed Forces, besides the Royal Netherlands Army, Royal Netherlands Navy, and the Royal Netherlands Air and Space Force. Besides patrolling the border, it also has the function of military police and protects the Royal Family.

=== North Korea ===
Border Security Command and Coastal Security Bureau are collectively responsible for restricting unauthorized cross-border (land and sea) entries and exits, in the early 1990s the bureaus responsible for border security and coastal security were transferred from the Ministry of State Security to the Ministry of National Defence. Sometime thereafter, the Border Security Bureau was enlarged to corps level and renamed the Border Security Command. Previously headquartered in Chagang Province, the Border Security Command was relocated to Pyongyang in 2002.

=== Pakistan ===
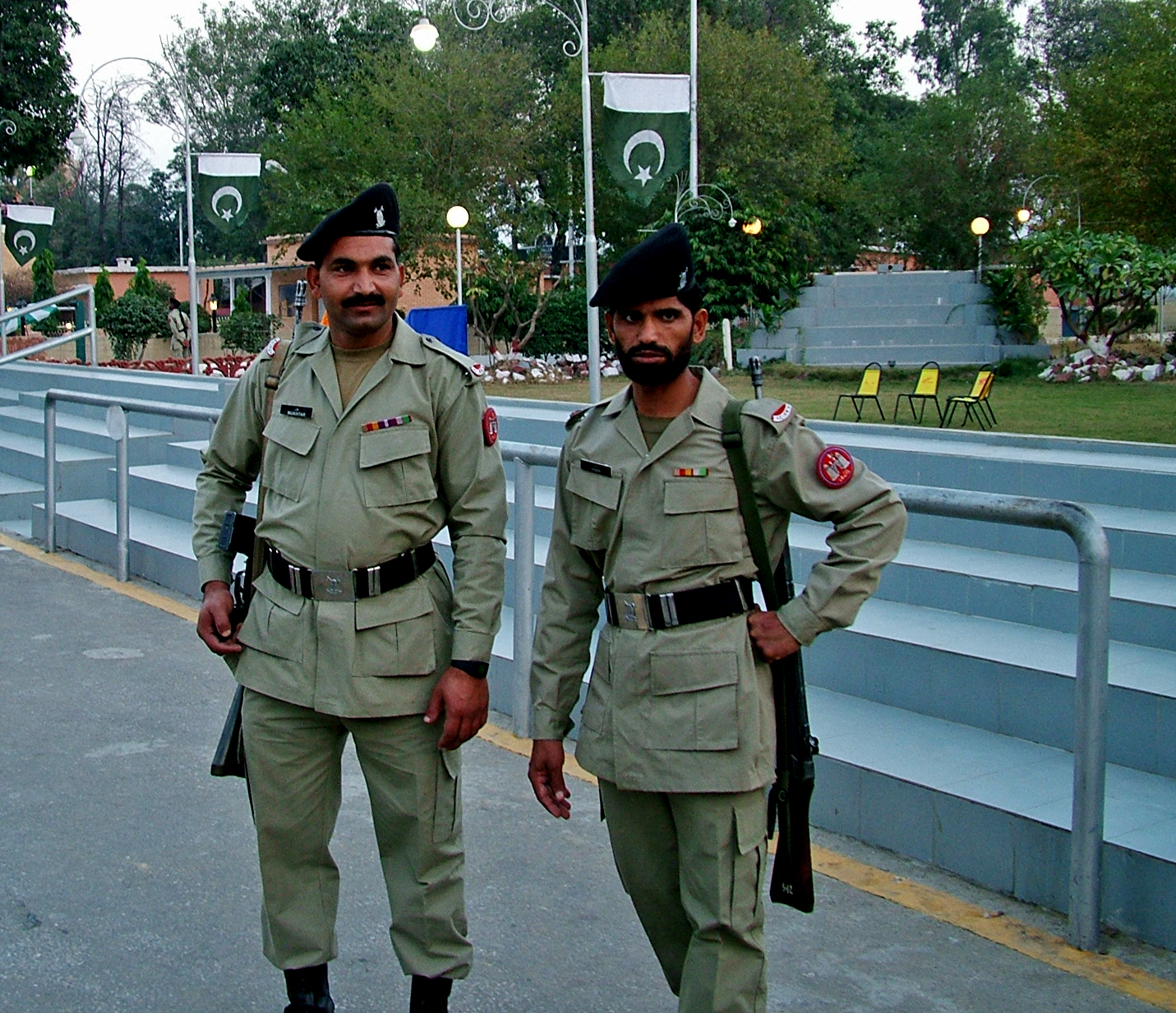
Two Pakistan Rangers at Wagah border.

The Frontier Corps (FC) (Urdu: فرنٹیئرکور) are four federal paramilitary forces recruited mostly from the tribal areas and led by officers from the Pakistan Army. The FC are stationed in the Khyber Pakhtunkhwa and Balochistan provinces. There are four distinct forces, known as FC Khyber Pakhtunkhwa (North), FC Khyber Pakhtunkhwa (South), FC Balochistan (North), and FC Balochistan (South). Each force is run by an "inspector general" who is a regular Pakistani Army officer of at least major-general rank, although the forces are officially part of the Interior Ministry.

The Pakistan Rangers are a pair of paramilitary forces under the control of the Ministry of the Interior. In 1995 the Pakistan Rangers divided into two parts; the Rangers Punjab headquartered in Lahore and the Rangers Sindh headquartered in Karachi. The two forces now have different uniforms and chains of command. They are both part of the Civil Armed Forces. There is a third corps headquarters in Islamabad but it is only for units transferred from the other corps for duties in the federal capital.

=== Panama ===
The National Border Service also called SENAFRONT (abbreviation for Servicio Nacional de Fronteras) is a police force specialized in the land border area and branch of the Panamanian Public Forces. Its mission is to protect Panama's land borders and protect its sovereignty and territorial integrity and protect rights and freedoms of people, maintain public order, prevent and investigate crimes within their jurisdictions.

Created in 2008, it is the border guard branch of the Panamanian Public Forces.

=== Russia ===
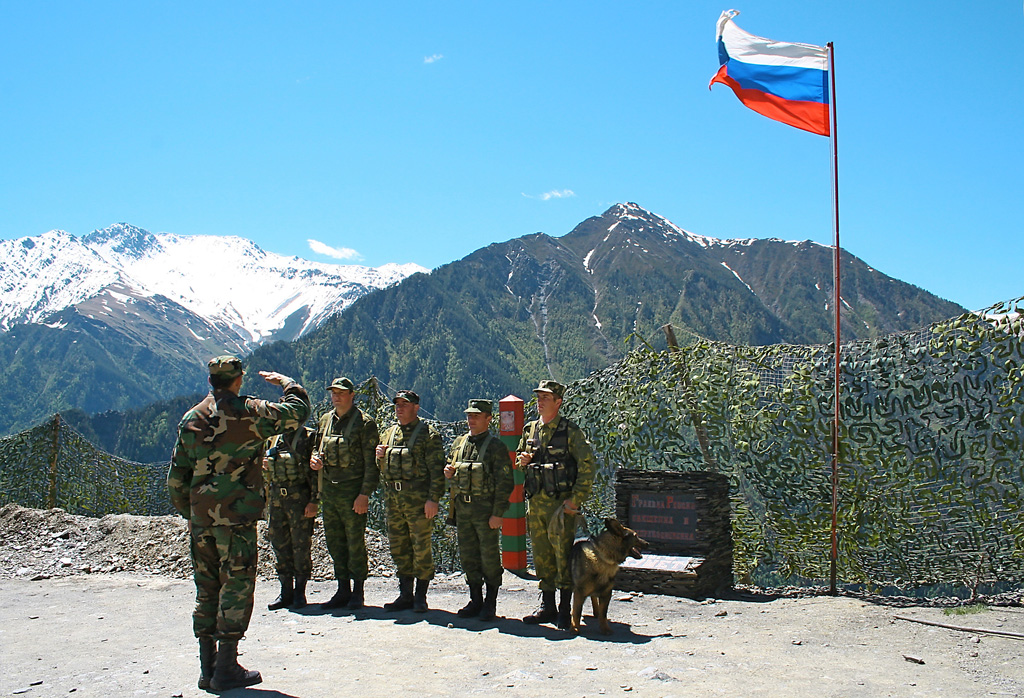
A border guard outpost in Dagestan, Russia

The Border Service of the Federal Security Service of the Russian Federation is the border protection service of Russia and is a direct component of the Federal Security Service (FSB). The agency considers itself a direct successor of the Soviet Border Troops, and regularly celebrates the anniversary of the founding of the latter (May 28, 1918). This annual event, known as the Border Guards Day, is celebrated every year by the guards in active service as well as former servicemen in Moscow and throughout the country.

=== Serbia ===
The Border Units (Граничне Јединице) were the military border guard of Serbia, until their disbandment on 1 February 2007. The Border Units consisted of 17 battalions, totaling between 5,500 and 7,000 personnel. They were spread out over more than a hundred border posts. The fittest conscripts were assigned to the Border Units, and underwent training similar to Special Forces. Under Serbian and also Yugoslav law, the Border Units were the only military formations that were allowed to conduct combat operations during peacetime.

Today the border is guarded by the units of the Ministry of Internal Affairs, specifically the Border Police. Their tasks are defined as: monitoring of the state border, increasing the level of security on airports and international waterways on the Danube, Sava, and Tisa rivers, suppression of cross-border crime, risk analysis, controlling the movement and stay of foreigners, and operation of border crossings.

=== Singapore ===
As an island, Singapore is surrounded by water and does not share land borders with other countries.

The Border control at Changi Airport, Seletar Airport, Singapore Cruise Centre, Marina Bay Cruise Centre Singapore, Tanah Merah Ferry Terminal, Marina South Pier, Tuas Checkpoint, Woodlands Checkpoint and Woodlands Train Checkpoint, Immigration and Checkpoints Authority and Singapore Customs control the passengers, vehicles and commodities.

Border security at coastal areas is the responsibility of the Police Coast Guard, a specialised division of the Singapore Police Force that monitors and enforces its maritime borders. Also, the Republic of Singapore Navy supports the Singapore Police Force, Immigration and Checkpoints Authority and Singapore Customs

=== South Korea ===
The Korea Immigration Service, a part of Ministry of Justice, is responsible for border control and border enforcement. The Korea Immigration Service issues visas, controls traffic of humans at ports of entry and immigration.

The Korea Customs Service, is a part of Ministry of Economy and Finance is responsible for enforcing customs such as tariffs and movement of goods at ports of entry.

=== Spain ===
In Spain, the law enforcement agencies Guardia Civil and National Police are responsible for protecting the borders. There is also a specialized service of the Department of Customs and Special Taxes, the Servicio de Vigilancia Aduanera, that has some general border guard duties.

=== Tajikistan ===
The Tajikistani Border Troops, also called the Border Service, are part of the Armed Forces of the Republic of Tajikistan and answer to the Ministry of Internal Affairs. They often trained with the Afghan Border Force, and jointly trained with the Armed Forces of the Kyrgyz Republic in 2011.

=== Thailand ===
The Border Patrol Police is Thailand's police force responsible for border security and counter-insurgency, and operates as the law-enforcement arm in conjunction with Thahan Phran, the ranger paramilitary arm of the Royal Thai Army.

=== Turkey ===
The General Directorate of Customs Protection is a special law enforcement agency from the Republic of Turkey that operates under the Ministry of Trade. The agency is primarily tasked with securing the country's borders, preventing smuggling, and enforcing laws related to the movement of commercial goods and passengers.

=== United Kingdom ===
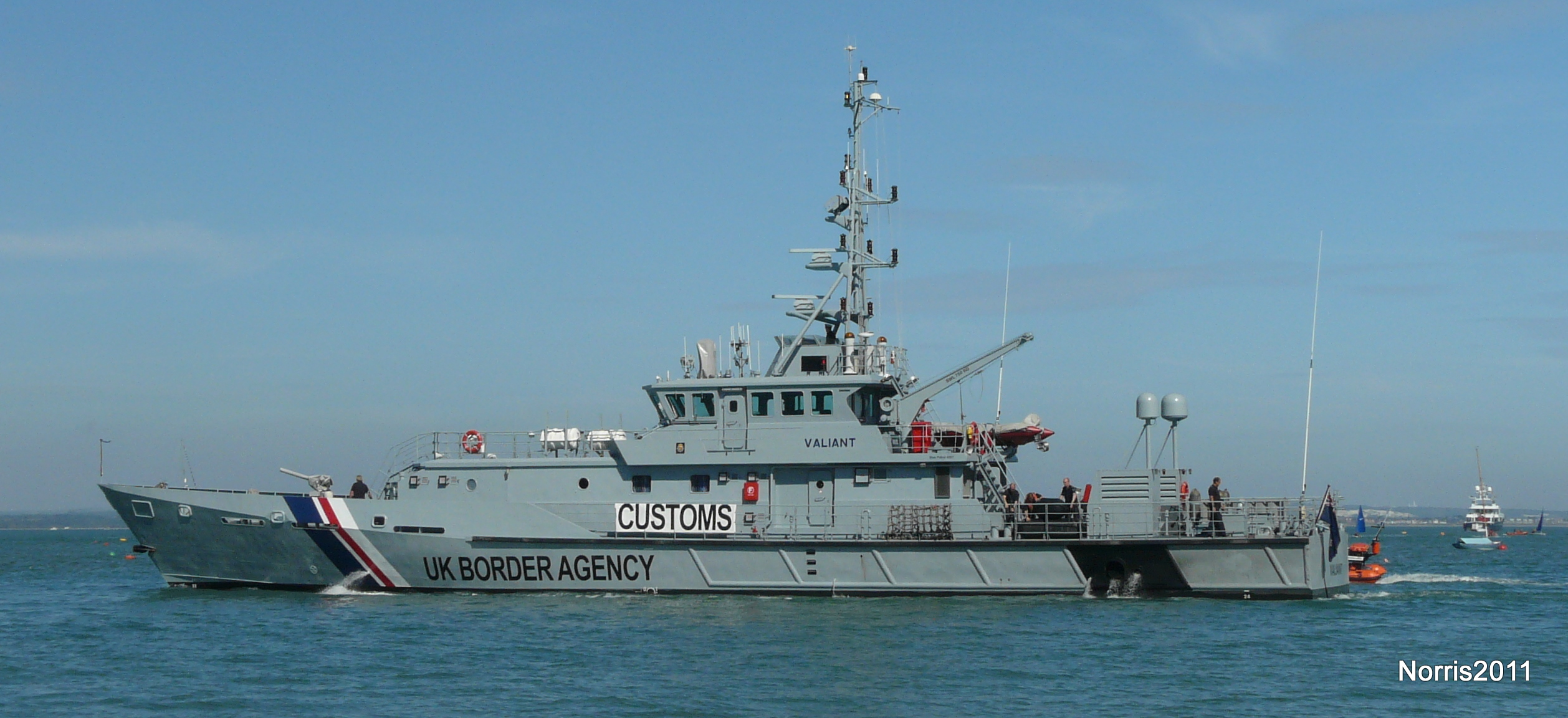
HMC Valiant with Border Force's preceding agency, UK Border Agency

Border guard services are provided by the Border Force, a law enforcement command within the Home Office. Border Force is responsible for immigration and customs enforcement at ports of entry into the UK, as well as in the UK's waters. Some territorial police forces on the south-east coast, such as Kent Police and Essex Police's marine units, also carry out limited immigration functions.

The UK's only land border, that with the Republic of Ireland, is not regularly patrolled by the UKBF, but is the responsibility of the Police Service of Northern Ireland.

=== United States ===
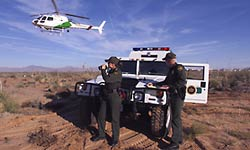
Border Patrol Agents with a Hummer and Astar patrol for illegal entry into U.S.

In the United States, border control is the responsibility of the Department of Homeland Security. This jurisdictional authority is shared by U.S. Customs and Border Protection (the primary inspection and enforcement component), the U.S. Coast Guard (the primary interdiction components) and U.S. Immigration and Customs Enforcement (the investigative component).

U.S. Customs and Border Protection (CBP) is composed of three distinct enforcement arms: the Office of Border Patrol (OBP, otherwise known as the United States Border Patrol), the Office of Field Operations (OFO; commonly called by its former name 'Customs') and the Office of Air and Marine (OAM). OBP is tasked with securing the international border in-between the Ports of Entry (POE) and is a mobile enforcement agency that is structured and employed like any other uniformed police department in the United States. OFO is the federal law enforcement branch tasked with administering the POE's (air, land or sea) and is responsible for determining the admissibility of all persons and goods into the United States. The OAM operates all aircraft and watercraft for CBP and coordinates their interdiction efforts with either OBP, U.S. Coast Guard and/or with U.S. Immigration and Customs Enforcement.

The U.S. Coast Guard is the only branch of military in the United States that is not subject to the Posse Comitatus Act of 1878. The reason being that both commissioned and petty officers are considered law enforcement officers with limited customs authority pursuant to 19 USC 1401. U.S. Coast Guard has jurisdiction in both domestic and international waters.

U.S. Immigration and Customs Enforcement has the same authority as both U.S. Customs and Border Protection and the U.S. Coast Guard, with the added jurisdiction of investigating violations that occur at both the border and the interior of the United States.

=== Vietnam ===
Vietnam Border Guard (Bộ đội Biên phòng Việt Nam) is a branch of Vietnam People's Army and is under command of Ministry of Defence. It has important roles in protecting Vietnam's sovereignty, maintaining security at land and sea borders. Vietnam Border Guard is established on 3 March 1959. It is organised into three levels: National Command, Provincial Command, and Local Post.

== See also ==
- List of national border guard agencies
- Security police
- Coast guard
- Border outpost
- Border checkpoint
- Border Patrol (disambiguation)
