= Operation Vermin =

Forced resettlement in the GDR, 1952/61

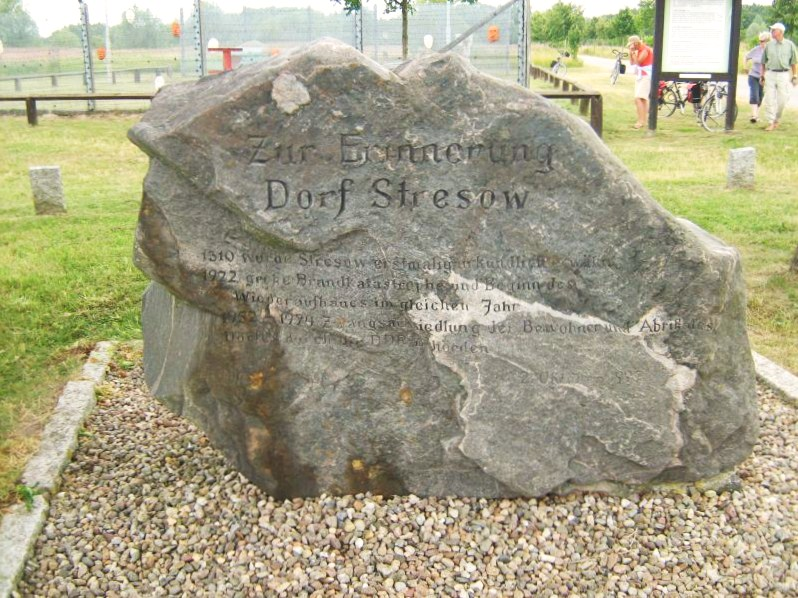
Memorial stone for the village of Stresow, vacated during the operations

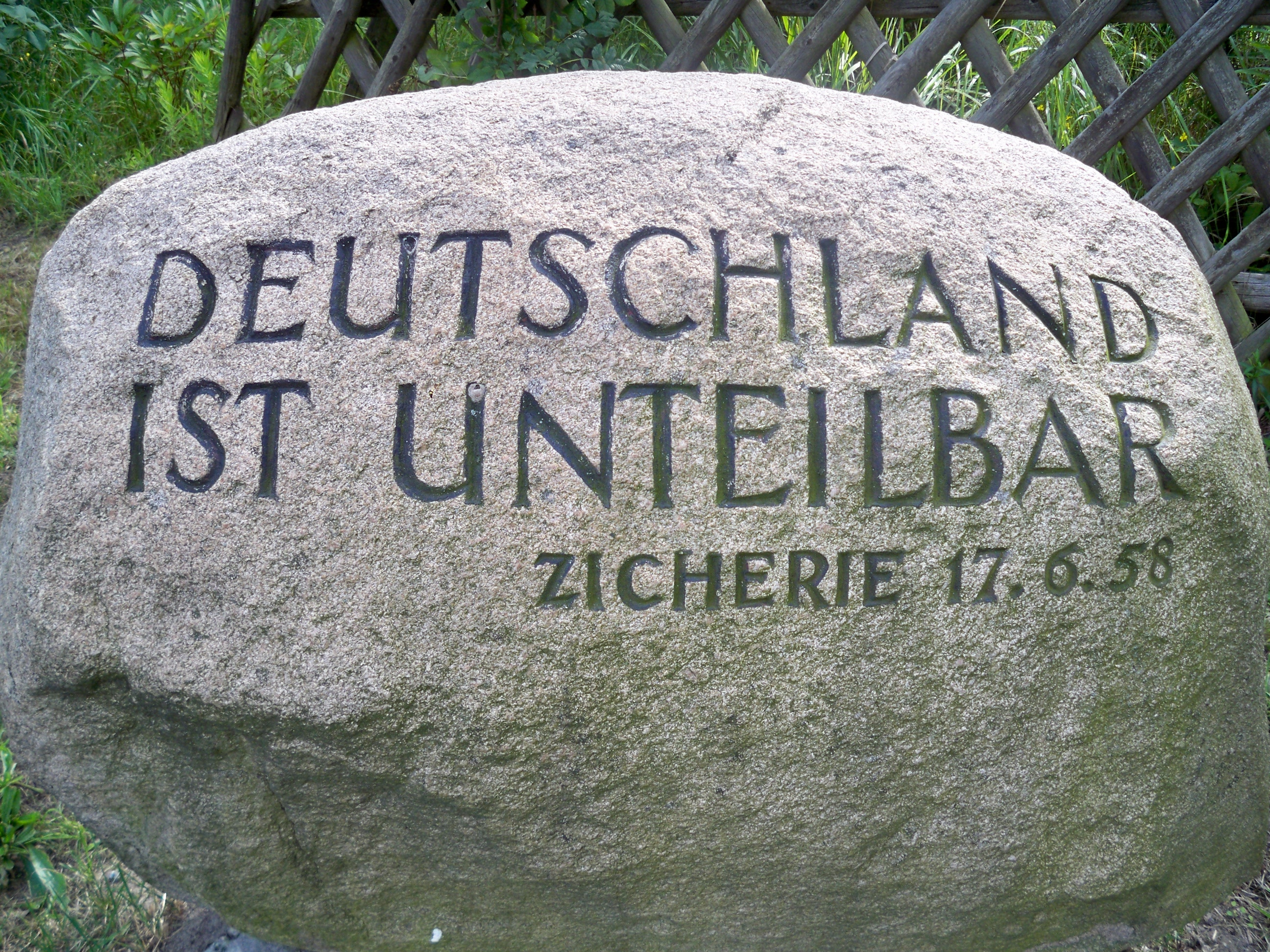
Memorialstone for the former double village Zicherie-Böckwitz (on the border between Lower Saxony and Saxony-Anhalt. Parts of Böckwitz, located in GDR territory, were torn down in 1952

Operation Vermin (Aktion Ungeziefer) and Operation Consolidation (Betriebskonsolidierung, its Stasi codename), also called Operation Cornflower (Aktion Kornblume) were two large-scale operations by the government of East Germany (the German Democratic Republic, GDR) meant to remove "politically unreliable" people from the exclusion zone along the Inner German border. The first operation was executed in June 1952 as “Operation Vermin”, the second one in October 1961 as “Operation Consolidation” and “Operation Cornflower”.

== Operation Vermin ==
“Operation Vermin” was a forced resettlement operation planned by the Thuringian section of the GDR Ministry of State Security (Stasi) and carried out by the national police force (Volkspolizei). During this operation, between May and June 1952, citizens the government described as “smugglers, money launderers and reactionaries“ and their families were forcibly resettled from the Inner German border to the country’s interior. Reason and background for this action was the “resolution concerning measures along the demarcation line between the German Democratic Republic and the Western occupation zones of Germany” passed by the Council of Ministers on May 26, 1952 and published in issue 65 of the Federal Law Gazette on May 27, 1952. Officially, the goal was the consolidation of the Inner German border. The man in charge was Secretary of State and former Prime Minister of Thuringia, Werner Eggerath.

Willy Gebhardt, Interior Minister and acting Prime Minister of Thuringia, supervised the execution of this operation in Thuringia. His handwritten note to Otto Funke, second chairman of the SED in Thuringia, about the number of people to be forcibly resettled into the East German interior in the course of the operation is often cited as a prime example of the inhuman or dehumanizing views of the GDR government. The note read “Otto, Gen. König just gave me these numbers. This would be the result of the Commission work to exterminate the vermin.” (Otto, General König, hat mir gerade diese Zahlen gegeben. Dies wäre das Ergebnis der Arbeit der Kommission zur Ausrottung des Ungeziefers.) According to another account, the first wave of resettlements only received its legendary name “Operation Vermin” (Aktion Ungeziefer) as a result of the aforementioned note, written on the final report of the resettlement operation in Thuringia for the authorities in Berlin.

== Operation Consolidation/Cornflower ==
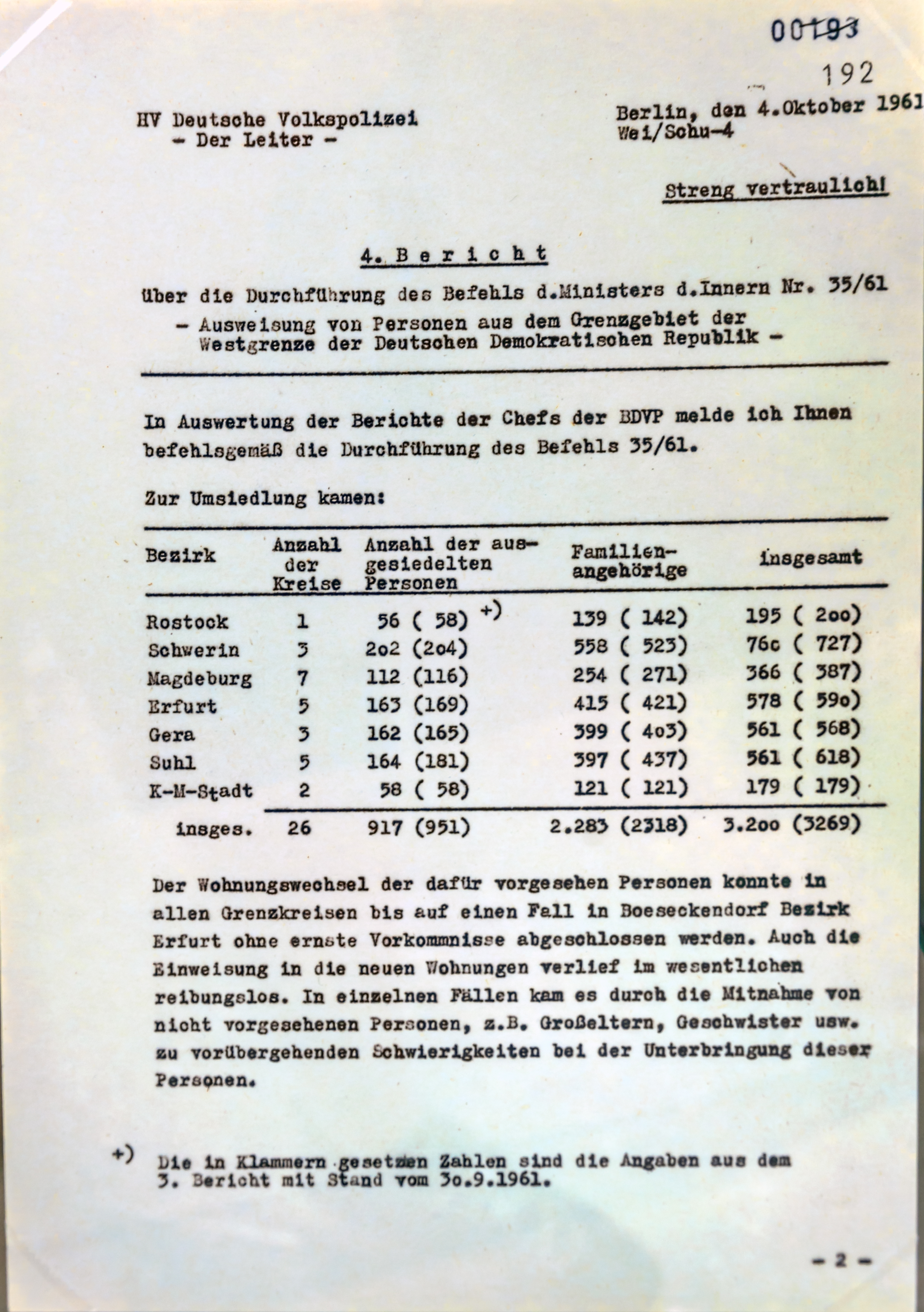
Report by the Volkspolizei about the execution of order 35/61 during Operation Consolidation. Exhibited in the Haus der Geschichte

A similar operation carried out in October 1961 was given different names by the operational commands in different districts. It was called “Operation Cornflower” (Aktion Kornblume) in Erfurt, “Operation New Life” (Aktion Neues Leben) in Magdeburg, “Operation Little Flower” (Aktion Blümchen) in Suhl, “Operation Fresh Air” (Aktion Frische Luft) in Karl-Marx-Stadt, “Operation Border” (Aktion Grenze) in Gera, and “Operation East” (Aktion Osten) in Rostock and Schwerin.

== Execution ==
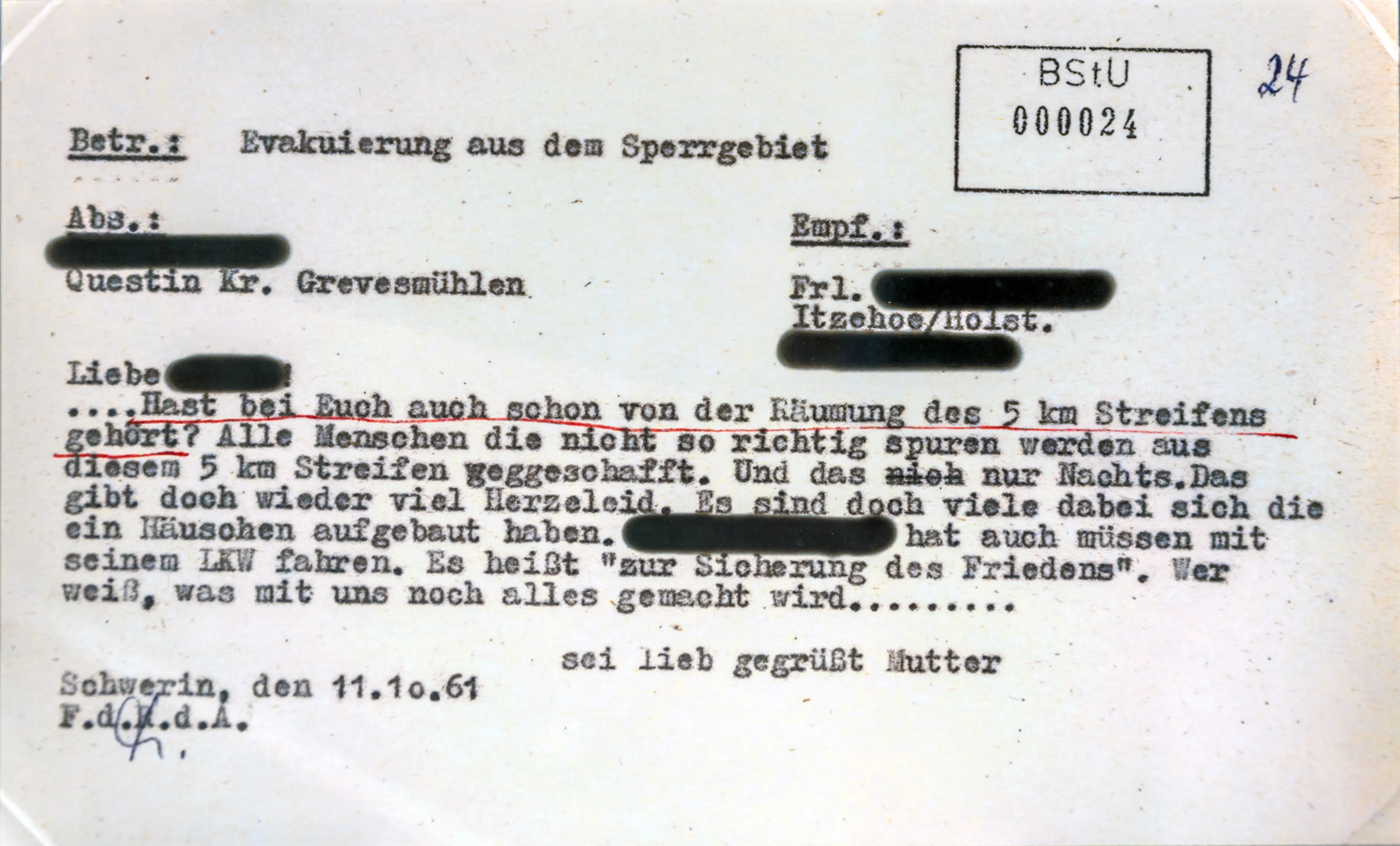
Letter by a victim, describing events during Operation Consolidation on October 11, 1961. Exhibited in the Haus der Geschichte

The assessment of “political unreliability” was often arbitrary, sometimes due to denunciations by neighbors. Because of this, the forced resettlement operations not only affected citizens with contacts in the West, churchgoers, former members of the NSDAP and its organizations, but also farmers who failed to meet their quotas and people who made any kind of negative comment about the state. Occasionally, whole villages protested against the measures. In these cases, the operations could only be carried out with the use of reinforcements and were delayed by several days. According to victim accounts, people and their belongings were loaded into freight trains and transported away without knowing their destination. Upon arrival, they were assigned new houses or apartments which were often not as valuable as the homes they were forced to leave behind. The neighbors at their new homes were told that the new arrivals were criminals, which meant that it was initially impossible for them to lead a normal social life. On the other side, the victims were told that the resettlement was a necessary measure to ensure peace. These lies were used to hide the political reasons behind the operations.

Six suicides are attested in connection to the forced resettlements.

Operation Vermin was undertaken to consolidate the GDR border regime after the Federal Republic of Germany and the Western Allies (France, United Kingdom, United States) signed the General Treaty (Generalvertrag). Operation Cornflower was a result of the travel restriction order passed on August 24, 1961.

== Historical reception ==
Historians assume that between 11,000 and 12,000 people were resettled during the operations and that about 3,000 more avoided forced resettlement by fleeing from the GDR. Two especially famous cases were the flights of 34 people from Billmuthausen in June 1952 and 53 people from Böseckendorf in October 1961, both of which are places in Thuringia. The media repeatedly bemoaned the lack of reparations to those displaced during the operations.
