= Böseckendorf =

- Ortsteil of Teistungen
- Coat of arms
- Interactive map of Böseckendorf
- Location within Germany Location within Thuringia
- Coordinates: 51°28′11″N 10°15′57″E
- Country: Germany
- State: Thuringia
- District: Eichsfeld
- Municipality: Teistungen

Population
  - Total: 252
- Time zone: UTC+01:00 (CET)
  - Summer (DST): UTC+02:00 (CEST)
- Website: http://www.lindenberg-eichsfeld.de

Böseckendorf (German pronunciation: [ˈbøːzəkənˌdɔʁf]) is a village in the Teistungen municipality in the district of Eichsfeld in Germany. It became famous during the Cold War for two mass escapes in 1961 and 1963 involving a total of 65 inhabitants – a quarter of the village's population – across the heavily fortified inner German border.

The village is first recorded in a deed of about 1250 of Count Ulrich von Regenstein for the monastery of Kloster Beuren. The entire village became a monastic settlement in 1431, after which the villagers were required to pay tithes to support the monastery. Its monastic ties were abolished in 1809.

After the end of the Second World War the village found itself just inside the Soviet occupation zone, which became the German Democratic Republic (East Germany) in 1949. The village is situated in a salient of the German Thuringia, surrounded on three sides by the border with Lower Saxony. In 1952 the inner German border was fortified by the East German government, with access to the West being cut off and Böseckendorf being added to the high-security Schutzstreifen ("protective strip") adjoining the border.

Thousands of inhabitants of the East German border region were expelled en masse in 1952 in an action, codenamed Operation Vermin (Aktion Ungeziefer), intended to rid the border villages of so-called "unreliable elements". In 1961, rumours of a new wave of mass expulsions began circulating in Böseckendorf. Many inhabitants, particularly farmers who had resisted the forced collectivization policies of the GDR regime, feared that they were on Stasi blacklists of those slated for expulsion.

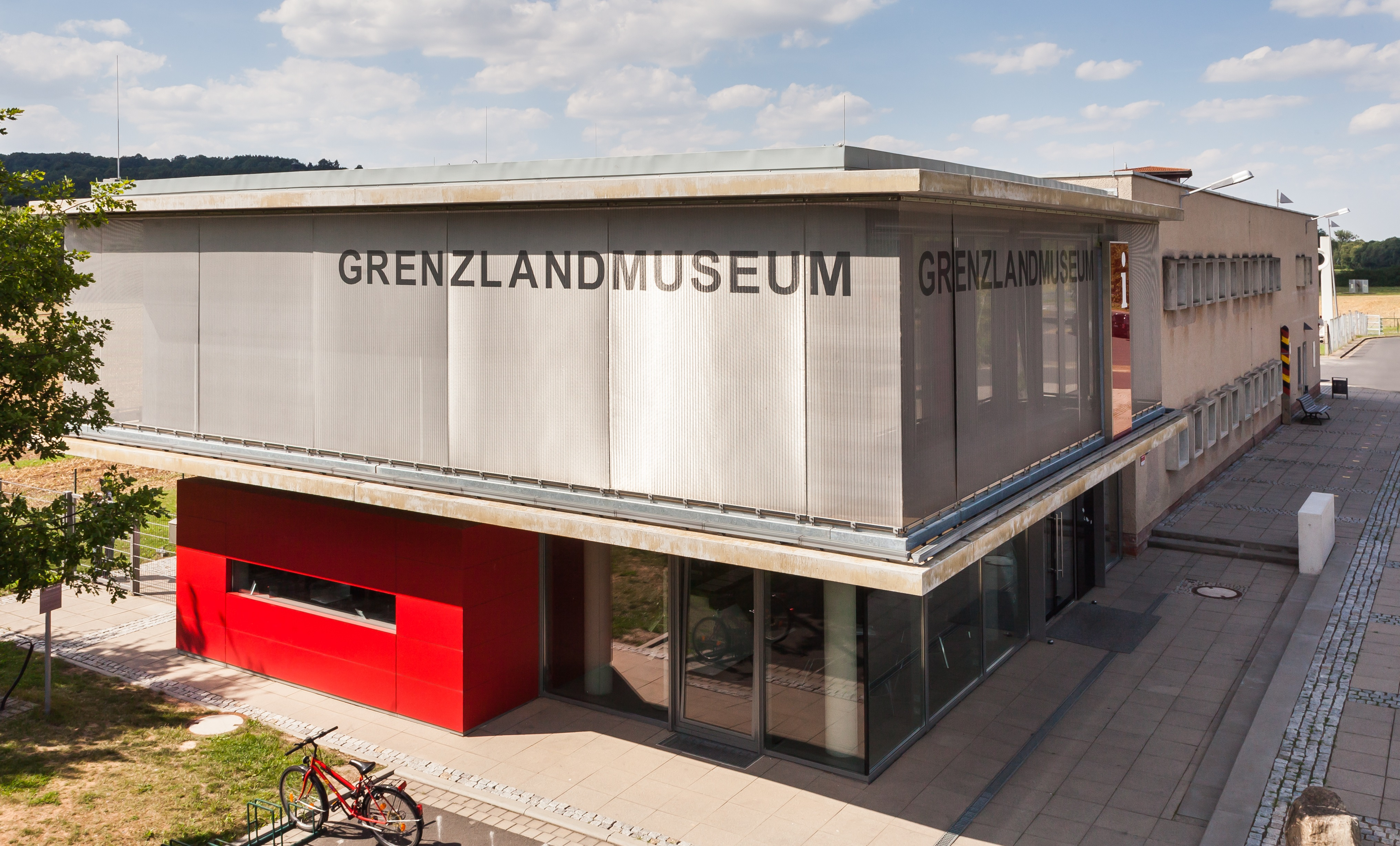
The Borderland Museum Eichsfeld in Thuringia provides information about the mass escapes of Böseckendorf in its permanent exhibition.

On the night of 2 October 1961, 53 people from twelve families – 16 men, 14 women and 23 children – fled from Böseckendorf across the border without being detected by the East German border guards. Their escape was celebrated in the West. Although the border was mined to prevent further escapes, a second mass escape occurred at Böseckendorf on 22 February 1963. Twelve people from two village families crossed the border successfully, led by a GDR border guard who was engaged to one of the escapees. He was able to guide the villagers across the border at a point that he knew was free of landmines. In March 1963 the West German authorities announced that they would build a new village for the escapees, to be named Neuböseckendorf (New Böseckendorf), located about 12 kilometres (7.5 mi) from the original village.

Detailed information about the mass escapes can be found at the Borderland Museum Eichsfeld which deals with different themes and aspects of the German division and the life in the GDR.

On 24 September 2009, the German television channel Sat.1 broadcast The Night a Village Vanished, a dramatised version of the 1961 mass escape.
