= Billmuthausen =

East German village destroyed in 1978

Coordinates: 50°17′N 10°47′E

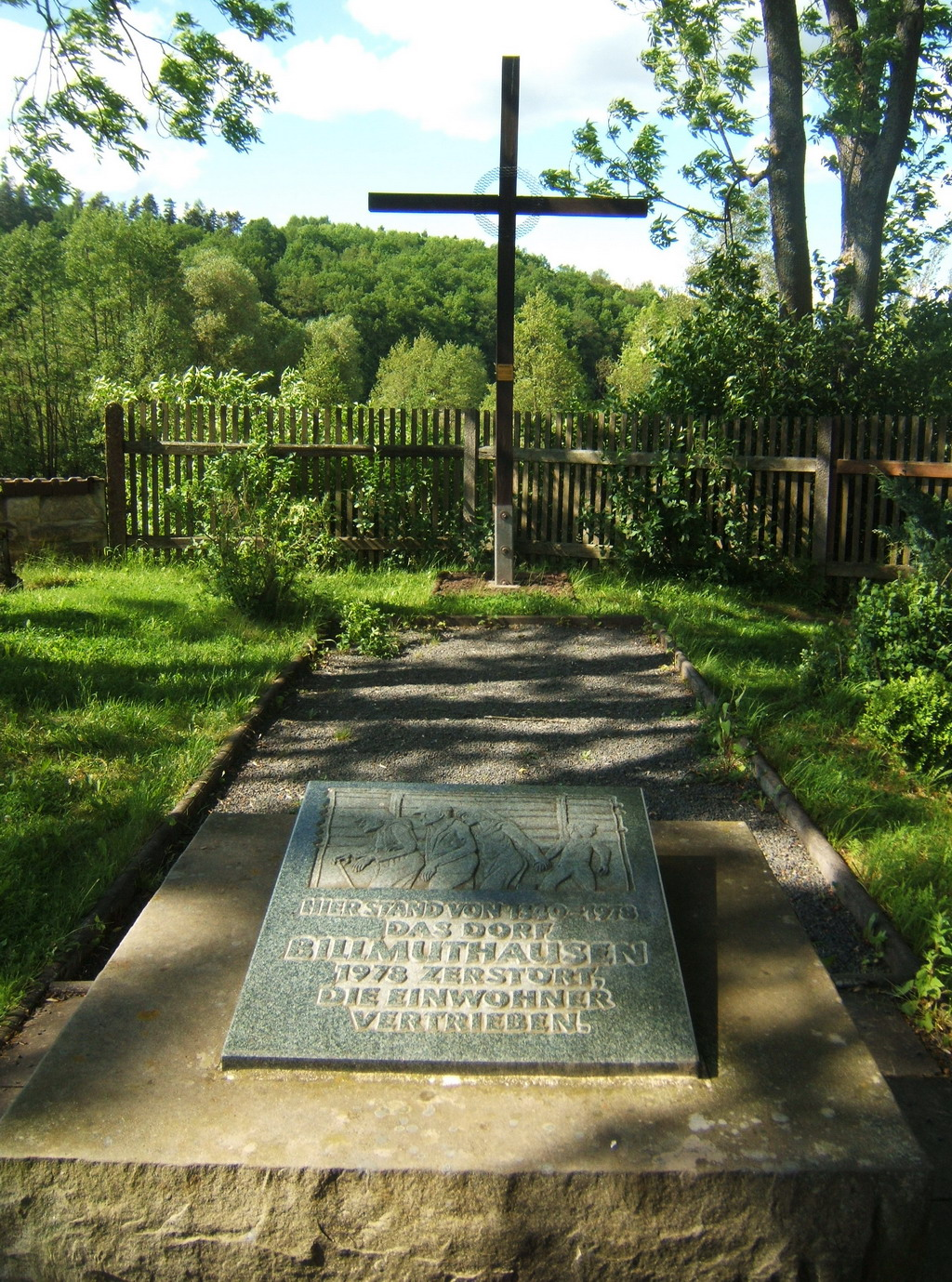
Billmuthausen memorial

Billmuthausen was a village in Germany, founded in 1340. It was destroyed by East German authorities in 1978 as it stood too close to the Inner German border (part of the larger "Iron Curtain"), the border between the post-war states of East and West Germany. It lay in the extreme south of Thuringia in the Heldburger Land in the district of Hildburghausen, only five hundred metres (1,600 ft) away from the Thuringian-Bavarian border. In January 1965, the authorities destroyed the small village church. In September 1978, the last family left the village, after which all the buildings in the village were demolished and the land leveled.

== History ==
Billmuthausen is first mentioned in historical records in 1340 under the name of Billmuthehusen and in 1528 under the name of Bylmethausen. In 1840, the village had 14 households, a mill and a church. A decade later, the village's population stood at 68.

The former site of the village is now a memorial with a marker stone and cross, and a new chapel is located at the site of destroyed church. All that remains is the village cemetery, a transformation tower and the village well. In 1991 the book Billmuthausen-das verurteilte Dorf was published about the village. There is an annual ceremony to commemorate the history of the village.

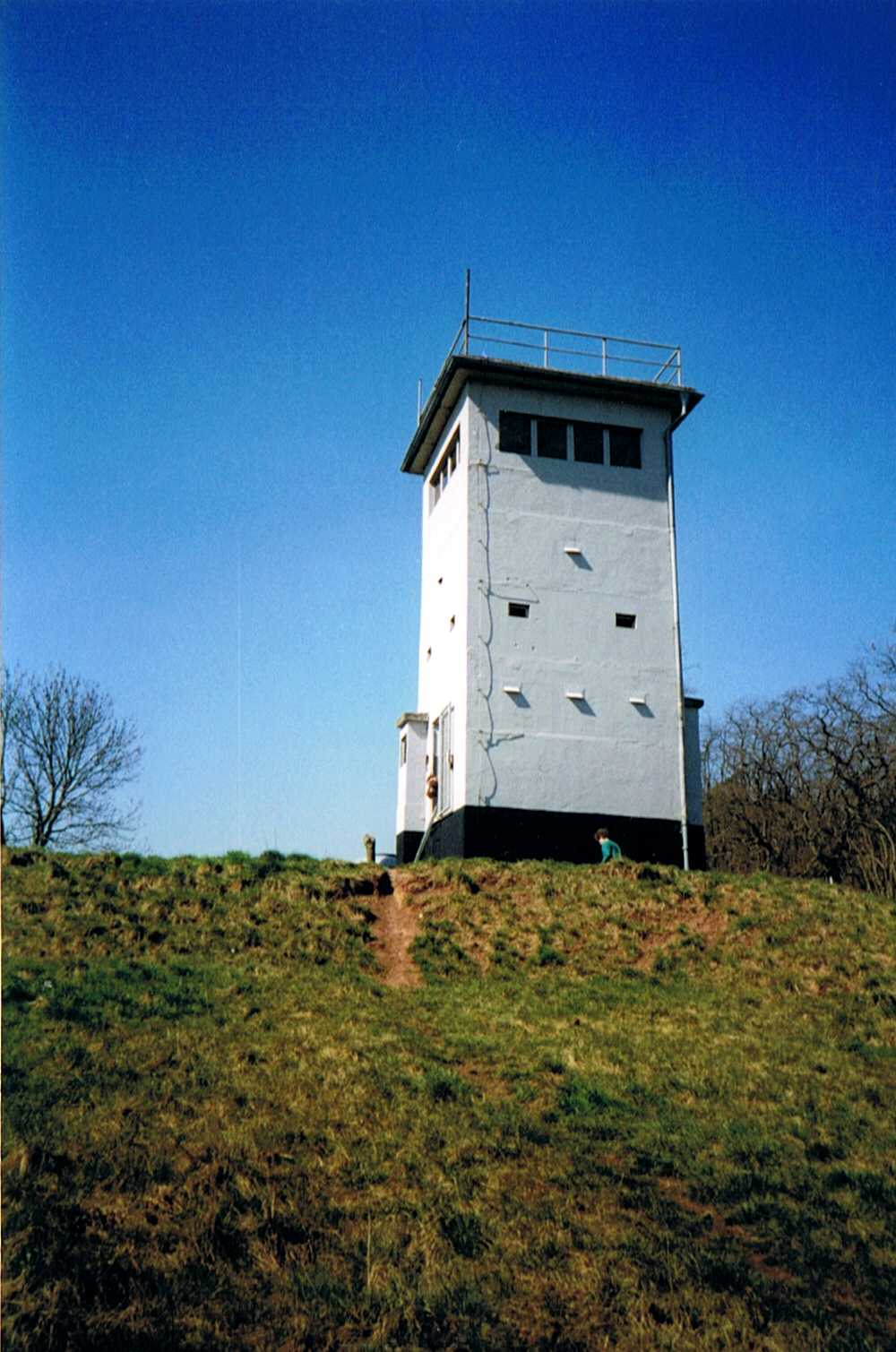
The former border security tower built by the East German forces nearby is today a protected habitat for bats and birds

== 2014 Church Bell consecration ==
On 31 May 2014, the bells of the razed church rang again at Billmuthausen after having been silent for 50 years. They were consecrated during a solemn ecumenical open-air church service attended by more than 150 participants. The two bronze bells, named Faith (Glaube) and Hope (Hoffnung) are kept in the Otto-Ludwig-Museum in Eisfeld and are moved to Billmuthausen on portable stands on commemorative occasions.
