= Game preservation =

Wildlife conservation practice

Game preservation is maintaining a stock of game to be hunted legally. It includes:

- Preventing poaching
- Preventing losses due to attack by predators.
- Encouraging breeding, and sometimes captive breeding for release.

== Britain ==
Until hand-held guns were invented, sport hunting was largely for the deer or wild boar (by hounds or bow-and-arrow, but Ælfric of Eynsham's Colloquium written in Anglo-Saxon times speaks of the usual way to catch deer being to drive them into a net), or hare (by a fast dog); the Colloquium mentions two stags and a wild boar as a typical day's catch.

What are now called game birds were caught by falconry, or had to be netted or snared or trapped or limed by a fowler employed by the owner of the hunting right. When the fowler used falconry, he seems to have needed to catch and train his hawks; the Colloquium mentions:

- The fowler offering to sell a hawk in exchange for a swift dog.
- That there are two sorts of hawks, the larger and the smaller, likeliest the goshawk and the sparrowhawk.

Most game preservation and poaching centered on deer.

The arrival of firearms changed bird-hunting. At first birds had to be stalked sitting, but changes in shotgun design in the 18th century made it possible to shoot them flying.

During the 18th and 19th centuries game preservation laws became ever more severe in favour of the rural gentry and their sport shooting rights. Game in Britain was mostly deer, hares, rabbits, pheasants, partridges, and grouse. Game caused much damage to crops, and a persistent complaint among the rural population was not being allowed to kill rabbits and hares to defend crops and garden vegetables. In Scotland farmers dreaded grouse invading ripening cornfields to eat the seeds, and deer in a few nights eating the whole of a crop of turnips intended as winter feed for cattle.

Steady growth of industrial towns in the later 19th century gradually built up a stock of population who when called to court (as magistrates or as jury members) could not be relied on to automatically support the rural gentry's side of court cases. In 1880 pressure from farmers over damage to crops caused by game and hunting led Gladstone's government to pass the Ground Game Act.

The book The Long Affray describes 38 violent fights in the 19th century and 3 in the 18th century, some with shooting and/or death, of gamekeepers plus their helpers versus poachers. Between 1833 and 1843 42 British gamekeepers lost their lives in such incidents. Between autumn 1860 and the end of 1861, over 40 gamekeepers were injured in Staffordshire, some grievously, in fights involving nearly 100 poachers.

Mantraps and spring guns were often deployed against poachers, but often caught wrong people: for example, a parson "botanizing", and a naval admiral's three sons who entered a game covert for an innocent reason; if a hunted fox went into a game covert the foxhunt sometimes lost hounds to devices meant to catch poachers' lurchers, and horses by stepping in mantraps.

In the 19th century, democratisation of local government in rural areas gradually reduced the power of the country squires.

As the Industrial Revolution advanced, large gangs of coalminers and factory workmen sometimes made poaching forays in numbers that forced the gamekeepers' men to back off and watch, such as:

- A gang of 60 or 70 poachers invaded Temple Newsam's game preserve near Leeds, shooting game up to the wall of the mansion.
- A gang of 50 to 60 coalminers and ribbon-weavers invaded D.S.Dugdale's game preserve near Coventry and Nuneaton and advanced through a game covert in line abreast: 28 had guns, 12 had sticks, and the rest each knocked two stones together; 2 accompanied on horseback to direct the advance of the line.

Through this time, selling game was illegal, but there was a widespread undercover system to transport legally shot and poached game (e.g. in the luggage compartments of stagecoaches) to traders in towns, much of it to Leadenhall Street in London. One thing that encouraged poaching was customers (including the caterers for the London Lord Mayor's Banquet) preferring game without shot damage and with no shot pellets embedded in its flesh: this favored game which had been netted or snared rather than shot.

=== Wildlife and game preservation ===
In Britain wild predators and scavengers were very badly affected by being shot by gamekeepers as "vermin" during the heyday of game preservation in the 18th and 19th centuries: for example, the gamekeepers' records of the Glengarry Estate in Scotland record killing in 3 years in the 19th century:

- Mammals: 11 foxes, 198 wildcats, 246 martens, 106 polecats, 67 badgers, 301 stoats and weasels, 46 otters, 78 house cats
- Birds of prey: 27 white-tailed sea eagles, 15 golden eagles, 3 honey buzzards, 18 ospreys, 63 goshawks, 285 common buzzards, 371 rough-legged buzzards, 83 hen harriers, 5 marsh harriers, 98 "blue hawks" (?= peregrine falcons), 7 orange-legged falcons, 275 kites, 11 hobby hawks, 78 merlin hawks, 6 gyr falcons, 462 kestrels, 35 "horned owls", 71 "fern owls" (?= short-eared owls)
- Other birds: 1431 hooded crows, 475 ravens, 8 magpies

=== Relevant laws ===
- 1389: King Richard II passed a law bringing in the Qualification law, which only allows men who own more than a certain value of land to hunt game.
- 1603: Trading in partridges and pheasants and deer was made illegal, but continued illegally through all the times following.
- 1723: The Black Act (9 Geo. 1. c. 22), made it a hanging offence to appear armed in a deer park or warren, or to hunt or steal deer, with the face blackened or disguised. Repealed in 1827.
- 1803: Ellenborough's Act made it a capital offence to forcibly resist arrest. (Gamekeepers had power of arrest.)
- 1827: Lord Suffield's Bill made mantraps and spring guns illegal.
- 1828: The Night Poaching Act 1828, forbids poaching by night, still in force; introduces penal transportation as a penalty for poaching.
- 1831: The Game Act 1831 (1 & 2 Will. 4. c. 32), established close seasons, and removed the Qualification restriction. Game became the property of whoever owned the land that it was on at the time. Buying and selling game legalised. Still in force.
- 1862: The Poaching Prevention Act 1862 allowed police to stop and search anyone on the road for evidence of poaching. (In theory, this was allowed only if the suspect was coming from a game preserve area.)
- 1868: Penal transportation ceases as Western Australia (the last British colony to do so) refuses to accept any more penal transportees.
- 1880: The Ground Game Act 1880, gave land occupiers including tenants the unalienable right to take hares and rabbits on their land. Still in force.

== France ==
Game preservation in France was enforced as severely and rigidly, until the French Revolution quickly violently ended the power of the rural gentry, and one of the revolutionary government's first actions was to sweep away the game preservation laws root and branch.

== See also ==
- Wildlife conservation
- UK environmental law
