= SM-70 =

Splittermine Modell 1970
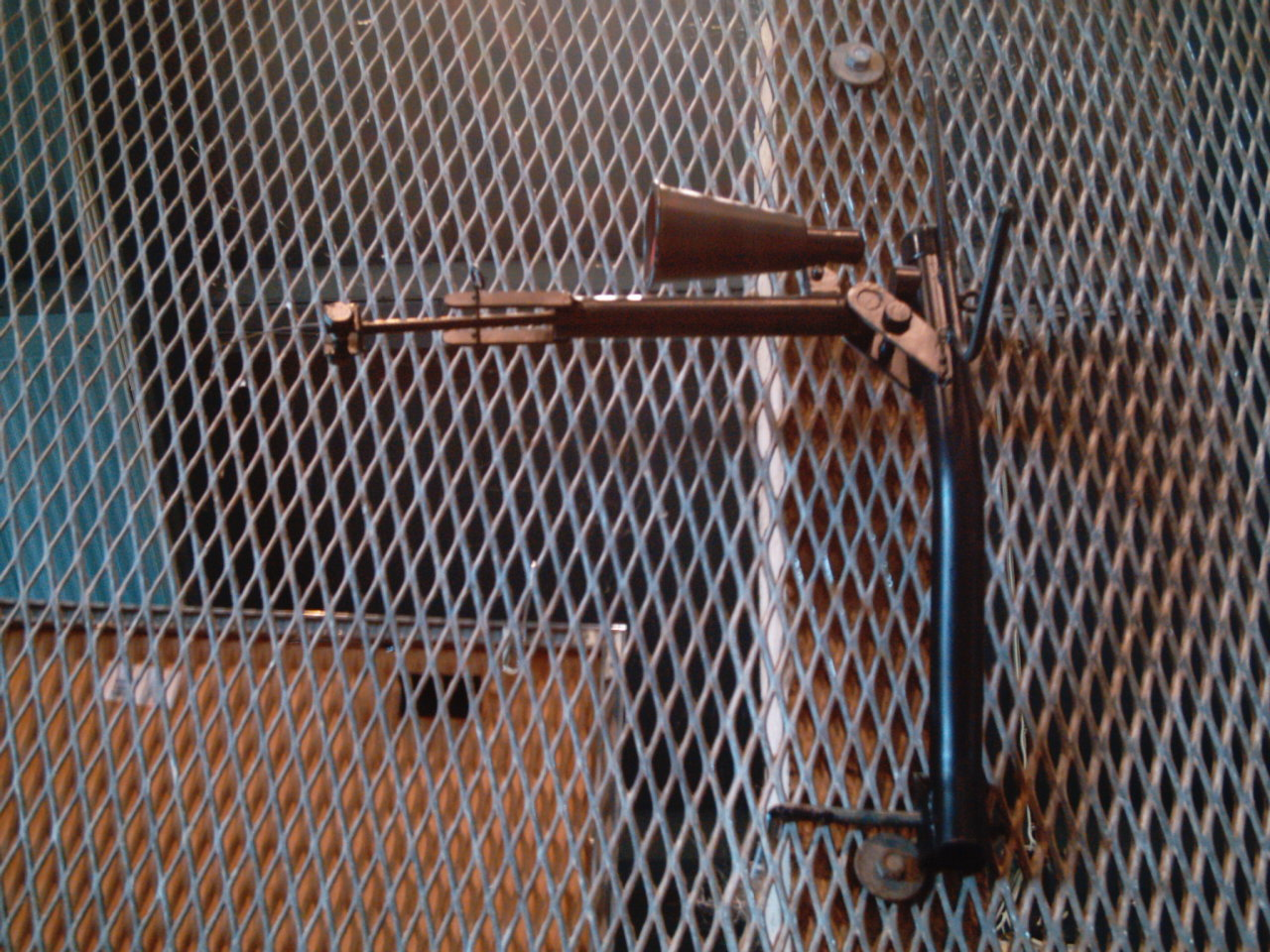
- Fence-mounted SM-70 at the Observation Post Alpha museum
- Type: Directional anti-personnel mine
- Place of origin: Czechoslovakia - 100 prototypes East Germany

Service history
- In service: 1970–1984
- Used by: East Germany
- Wars: Cold War

Production history
- No. built: 60,000

Specifications
- Mass: 191 g
- Length: 350 mm
- Diameter: 150 mm
- Effective firing range: 25 m
- Maximum firing range: 120 m
- Filling: 110 g TNT explosive ~80 steel cube projectiles
- Detonation mechanism: Tripwire initiated N-172 (pull or tension release)

The SM-70 (Splittermine Modell 1970) is an Czechoslovakia - 100 prototypes / East German directional fragmentation antipersonnel mine developed specifically to combat Republikflucht (defection) across the Inner German Border (Grenze) into West Germany.

== Design ==
Erich Lutter, an SS leader who headed Department II D 4 (weapons) in the Reich Security Main Office, developed the concept in 1942 for automatic shooting systems on the fences of concentration camps and ghettos known as Scharfschützenmine (Sniper mine). This was intended to prevent prisoners from escaping with minimal personnel expenditure. Lutter's designs were never realized.

According to the journalist Georg Bensch, his plans fell into the hands of the victorious Soviet power after the Second World War. The GDR used these plans to develop their own automatic shooting systems. In 1966, the first devices under East Germany were developed with the help of the military technical institute "VUSTE" in Czechoslovakia between Salzwedel and Arendsee, where the automatic firing systems was tested on pigs that were driven into the relevant areas.

First fielded in 1970, the mines were cone-shaped, tripwire activated, and mounted to concrete posts along the line of climb-resistant prefabricated steel mesh fence. In some cases, they were mounted directly to the fence itself. They were aimed parallel with the fence line, and intended to kill or incapacitate anyone attempting to climb or cut through the fence.

== Service ==
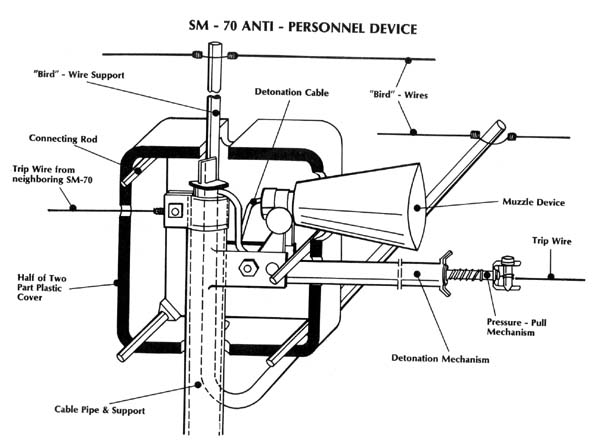
A US Army schematic of the SM-70

Beginning in late 1970, approximately 60,000 SM-70s were installed on 440 kilometers (273 mi) of particularly escape-prone rural sections of the East German border. Installation of the mines cost 100,000 East German marks per kilometer, for a total cost of over 44 million marks. The mines were not used on the Berlin Wall. Initial plans called for the SM-70 to completely replace the buried PMN anti-personnel mines along the border, but initial problems with the electrical firing devices after exposure to the elements actually resulted in more PMN mines being emplaced as a stopgap measure. When fired, the SM-70 produced a cone of fire lethal within 25 meters (82 ft). One East German described finding a deer shredded by an SM-70, noting that a 5 m area "appeared as if it had been worked over by a rake."

Although referred to within the Border Guards by the National People's Army designation G-501, for propaganda purposes the mines were referred to as "Automatic Firing Devices" (German: "Selbstschussanlage") in public documents. The cryptic description led to the public perception that the mine was a type of automated sentry gun (rather than a simple static trip-mine), a misconception shared even with Western intelligence agencies. In fact, no such technology existed during the lifespan of East Germany, and the mine was actually more similar in capability to an oversized spring gun, but the rumors provided an additional psychological deterrent to would-be border crossers. From 1973 onward, the mines were enclosed in a plastic box housing for protection from the elements, further concealing their design from onlookers.

Oversensitivity of the trip wires proved to be a vexing challenge throughout the service life of the SM-70. The wires proved sensitive enough to trigger the mines if a bird rested on the wire, resulting in a large number of accidental detonations in early deployment; this led to an inert "bird wire" being strung slightly above the first actual trip wire to give the birds something to rest on without risking a discharge. This proved only somewhat effective, as the mines still regularly suffered unintentional detonations due to heavy winds, deer and other animals, snow and ice accumulation, falling tree branches, bramble overgrowth, and rock-throwing West Germans.

== Michael Gartenschläger ==
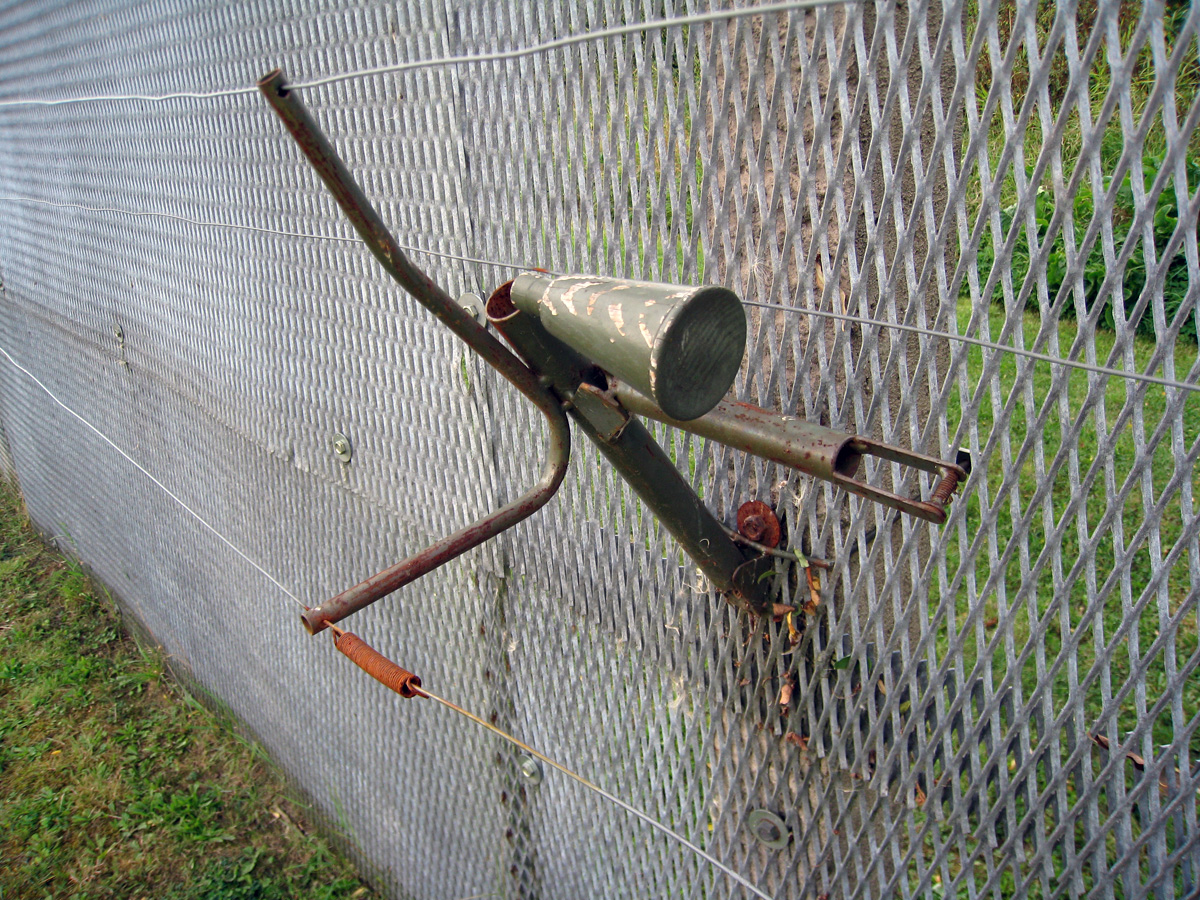
Replica SM-70 at the Grenzhus Schlagsdorf

The true nature and purpose of the SM-70 was eventually determined after Hamburg resident and former East German political prisoner Michael Gartenschläger — who had led a party of six defectors in a successful escape across the border in 1971—successfully infiltrated the border defenses near Büchen on 30 March 1976, dismantled a live SM-70 from its mount, and returned safely to present the mine to West German authorities for inspection. Against official advice, Gartenschläger made a second successful trip to the same section of fence on 23 April and retrieved another live SM-70. The event made West German newspapers, and tipped off the border guards that the sector was being targeted for sabotage. A special 29-member task force was assembled to prepare concealed firing positions in the area and set up an ambush for the culprit.

On 1 May 1976, as Gartenschläger was climbing over the East German fence for his third attempt, he was captured in the beam of a searchlight and blown off his ladder by a fatal burst of automatic gunfire. There was no request for surrender.

In 2005, the border guard who shot and killed him was acquitted of all charges in a German court.

Following the recovery and analysis of the intact SM-70 in 1976, international public outcry led to diplomatic protests with the East German government. When the hard-currency starved GDR approached the West for a loosening of relations in exchange for trade, the sole sticking point in the West German platform was the removal of the SM-70. This suited the GDR as well, since Erich Honecker believed the SM-70 was troublesome, expensive and bad for the GDR's image. He had already intended to remove them anyway (along with the rest of the buried mines) when he implemented his plan for a fully "electronic" border defense grid (Grenze 2000). Honecker's plan eventually fell through due to lack of funding, but the SM-70 continued to be removed as per the agreement. These were replaced with extra buried PMN mines, which remained in place until the fall of East Germany in 1990.

== See also ==
- Amappo
- Molniya (explosive trap)
- PARM 1 mine
- Zf.Ger.38
- Samsung SGR-A1
