= Aaron Rasmussen =

American inventor and game designer

- Education: Boston University
- Website: aaronrasmussen.com

Aaron Rasmussen is an American CEO and game designer. He is the co-founder of MasterClass, an online education platform, USMechatronics and Harcos Laboratories and the founder of Outlier.org, a college level education platform that offers online college courses. In 2012, he and co-creator Michael T. Astolfi created and crowdfunded BlindSide, a survival/horror adventure game, which was a finalist at IndieCade 2012. In 2005, while a student at Boston University, he invented a robotic sentry gun.

== Early life ==
During a chemistry class in high school, Rasmussen was involved in a chemical explosion from a combination of red phosphorus and potassium chlorate, which resulted in him being temporarily blind; this temporary blindness later inspired the creation of BlindSide.

== Career ==
Rasmussen co-founded the online education platform MasterClass with David Rogier in 2012, and was responsible for its style and production processes.

In 2018, Rasmussen founded Outlier.org, a university-level education platform that allows students to take online classes for college credit that are accredited by the University of Pittsburgh.
