= MasterClass =

American online education company

- Website type: Private
- Founded: October 2014; 12 years ago (as Yanka Industries)
- Headquarters: San Francisco, California, U.S.
- Founders: David Rogier; Aaron Rasmussen
- Key people: David Rogier (CEO); Valen Tong (CFO); David Schriber (CMO); Len Amato (CCO)
- Industry: Online education
- Employees: 480 (2022)
- Website: masterclass.com

Yanka Industries, Inc., doing business as MasterClass, is an American online education subscription platform on which students can access tutorials and lectures pre-recorded by experts in various fields. The concept for MasterClass was conceived by David Rogier and developed with Aaron Rasmussen.

== History ==
MasterClass was founded by David Rogier while a student at Stanford University, originally under the name "Yanka Industries". Rogier, who continues to serve as chief executive officer (CEO), asked Aaron Rasmussen to join the company as a co-founder and chief technology officer; Rasmussen would also serve as creative director, before leaving in January 2017. The website launched under the MasterClass name on May 12, 2015.

MasterClass launched in 2015 with three instructors, and twelve classes were added in 2017. In late 2017, an acting class given by Kevin Spacey was removed after multiple sexual assault allegations were publicly made against the actor. By late 2018 MasterClass had about 50 classes and 1,000 lessons. Support for mobile devices was first added in April 2018. MasterClass hired David Schriber as chief marketing officer in June 2019.

In June 2022, the company laid off 20% of its staff, citing the worsening macroeconomic environment.

== Classes ==
MasterClass produces online classes with well-known instructors in their field of expertise. Classes cover topics like writing, sports, and cooking. As of 2019, the company was expanding into politics, economics, and video game design. Many instructors do live demonstrations if the topic is easy to illustrate visually, while writers lecture.

The courses are available through an annual subscription. The classes are typically not interactive, though at least one course included interactive assignments where the student acted with other students, either in person or over Skype.

== Funding ==
MasterClass was started with $4.5 million in initial funding and two seed-funding rounds totaling $1.9 million. This was followed by $15 million in funding announced in 2016, $35 million in 2017, and $80 million in 2018. In May 2020, MasterClass raised $100 million in a Series E funding round led by Fidelity Investments, bringing total funding to approximately $240 million.

In May 2021, the company received $225 million in a Series F round, giving it a $2.75 billion valuation according to CNBC reporting.

== Reception ==
Reviewers have noted that some of the courses, such as those related to the performing arts, require that students already have some basic proficiency. The courses were also noted for their high production values, and for inspiring students to continue to pursue the subject matter. Exposure to popular celebrities was also reported as a benefit. The Verge noted that while the subscriptions initially lasted a lifetime, different courses have different replay value. The publication also noted the challenge of keeping students on the site to take additional classes.

In 2019, chef Dominique Ansel's MasterClass on French pastries received a James Beard Foundation Broadcast Media Award in the Online Video, Fixed Location and/or Instructional category.

In 2020, MasterClass won two Webby Awards, for Education & Reference in the Apps, Mobile & Voice category, and for Media Streaming in the Web category. MasterClass won two Webby Awards in 2021, as well as a Webby People's Voice Award.

== Notable instructors ==
Notable instructors include:

- Christina Aguilera
- Madeleine Albright
- Dominique Ansel
- Judd Apatow
- Margaret Atwood
- David Axelrod
- Simone Biles
- Sara Blakely
- Massimo Bottura
- Bobbi Brown
- Dan Brown
- Ken Burns
- LeVar Burton
- George W. Bush
- James Cameron
- Mariah Carey
- Nancy Cartwright
- Noam Chomsky
- Jimmy Chin
- Bill Clinton
- Hillary Clinton
- Misty Copeland
- Stephen Curry
- Deadmau5
- Es Devlin
- Sheila E.
- Donna Farhi
- Ron Finley
- Jodie Foster
- Tan France
- Futura
- Neil Gaiman
- Frank Gehry
- Malcolm Gladwell
- Jane Goodall
- Doris Kearns Goodwin
- Lewis Hamilton
- Herbie Hancock
- Tony Hawk
- Werner Herzog
- Ron Howard
- Bob Iger
- Phil Ivey
- Samuel L. Jackson
- Madhur Jaffrey
- Jon Kabat-Zinn
- Garry Kasparov
- Thomas Keller
- Alicia Keys
- Jeff Koons
- Spike Lee
- Annie Leibovitz
- David Lynch
- Yo-Yo Ma
- Lynnette Marrero
- Steve Martin
- Reba McEntire
- Brandon McMillan
- Metallica
- Helen Mirren
- Tom Morello
- Nas
- Daniel Negreanu
- Joyce Carol Oates
- Yotam Ottolenghi
- James Patterson
- Amy Poehler
- Apollonia Poilâne
- Michael Pollan
- Natalie Portman
- Gordon Ramsay
- Shonda Rhimes
- Condoleezza Rice
- Karl Rove
- RuPaul
- Carlos Santana
- Martin Scorsese
- David Sedaris
- Aaron Sorkin
- Ringo Starr
- James Suckling
- Amy Tan
- Terence Tao
- Penn & Teller
- Timbaland
- Michael W. Twitty
- Neil deGrasse Tyson
- Usher
- Armin van Buuren
- St. Vincent
- Diane von Fürstenberg
- Christopher Voss
- Alice Waters
- Kelly Wearstler
- Cornel West
- Serena Williams
- Anna Wintour
- Hans Zimmer

== See also ==
- List of online educational resources
