= Briney =

Briney may refer to:

- Christopher Briney (born 1998), American actor
- Katko v. Briney, 1971 Iowa Supreme Court lawsuit
