= Gun-powered mousetrap =

1882 mousetrap design

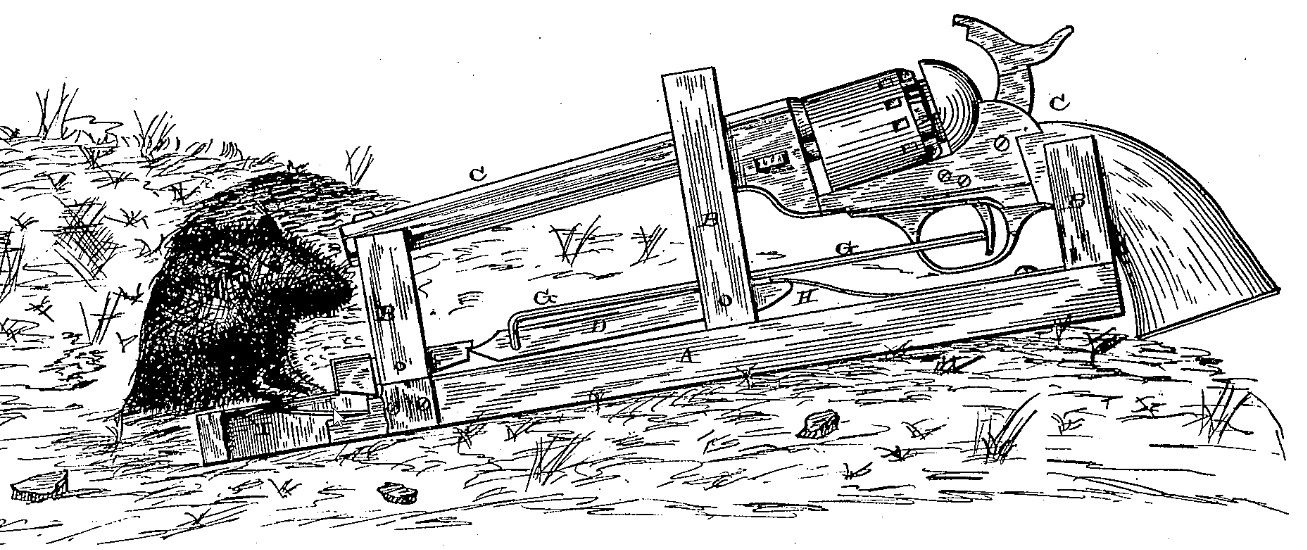
Drawing from US Patent 269766, "Animal trap"

On August 21, 1882, James Alexander Williams from Fredonia, San Saba County, Texas filed a US patent application (issued as United States patent No. 269,766) for a mousetrap incorporating a handgun, "by which animals which burrow in the ground can be destroyed".

The Specification suggests that the device might also be used to kill or injure "any person or thing" that opens the door or window that it is attached to.

The patent issued on December 26, 1882 and James Alexander Williams said "The object of my invention is to provide a means by which animals who burrow in the ground can be destroyed, and which the trap will give an alarm each time that it goes off, so that it can be reset."

== Design ==
US Patent 269,766, issued December 26, 1882, to James Alexander Williams of Fredonia, Mason County, Texas, describes a frame with a pistol or revolver secured to it, and a spring, levers and rod which would activate the gun's trigger when an animal stepped on a treadle in front of the muzzle, killing the animal.

Williams said that the invention could also be used to "kill any person or thing opening [a] door or window to which it is attached". He compared it to other similar inventions which were used as burglar alarms. He stated in his patent application that another feature of the design was that the gunshot would act as an alarm: when the trap's gun was fired the gunshot noise would alert the user that the trap had been triggered.

== Reception ==
The United States Patent Office has issued more than 4,400 mousetrap patents. The gun-powered mousetrap proved inferior to spring-powered mousetraps descending from William C. Hooker's 1894 patent. However, the 1882 patent has continued to draw interest–including efforts to reconstruct a version of it–due to its unconventional design. In 2015, Vox listed Williams' device as Number 5 on its list of "7 horrifying attempts at building a better mousetrap", and in 2012 Business Insider called it "the best mousetrap ever".

== See also ==
- Sentry gun – Weapon that automatically aims and fires at targets
- Spring-gun
