= Harcos Laboratories =

American caffeinated products company

- Type: Caffeinated novelty energy supplements/consumables
- Manufacturer: Harcos LLC
- Origin: United States
- Introduced: 2008
- Flavour: Various
- Variants: Mana Energy Potion, Health Energy Potion, Blood Energy Potion, Zombie Blood, Zombie Jerky, Love/Luck Energy Potion, Nuclear Energy Powder

Harcos LLC (Harcos Laboratories) was a maker of caffeinated novelty energy supplements and consumables. Harcos Laboratories operated out of Santa Monica, California.

== Company history ==
Harcos Laboratories was formed in 2007 by Aaron Rasmussen and Elijah Szasz, both co-workers in the industrial robotics industry.

In January 2008, Mana Energy Potions was released. The product itself was packaged in a bottle similar to those seen in video games. After gaining attention on national television, internet geek blogs, and news sites, Mana Energy Potion started being sold in retailers around the United States.

In January 2009, Health Energy Potion was released. Much like Mana, Health retained its virtual-counterpart look with the color and bottle shape found in video games.

In October 2009, Harcos began distributing Blood Energy Potion. The energy supplement in an IV bag pouch contained a caffeinated liquid with a similar color (deep red), consistency and nutritional profile of blood by packing iron, protein, enzymes and electrolytes into a fruit punch supplement. This product was targeted toward horror and vampire culture fans.

Additional products included Nuclear Energy Powder, Zombie Blood, Love Energy Potion, Luck Energy Potion, and Zombie Jerky.

== Culture ==
Harcos Labs targeted consumers around the United States as well as gamers and fans of popular culture. Harcos Labs has appeared at Comic-Con, PAX, Anime Expo, and many other conventions nationwide since 2008.

Mana Energy Potions have been featured in the video games ARCA Sim Racing, BlazBlue: Calamity Trigger, and Mystic Emporium.

== See also ==
- List of energy drinks
