= Protocol on Mines, Booby-Traps and Other Devices =

Sub-section of the 1980 Convention on Certain Conventional Weapons

The Protocol on Prohibitions or Restrictions on the Use of Mines, Booby-Traps and Other Devices, or Protocol II, is a United Nations treaty that restricts the use of land mines, remotely delivered mines, and booby traps. It is Protocol II to the 1980 Convention on Certain Conventional Weapons.

== Content ==
The Protocol prohibits the use of land mines, remotely delivered mines, or booby traps to kill civilians or to cause superfluous injury or unnecessary suffering to soldiers. It also prohibits the use of booby traps that are "attached to or associated with" any of the following features:

(a) internationally recognized protective emblems, signs or signals;
(b) sick, wounded or dead persons;
(c) burial or cremation sites or graves;
(d) medical facilities, medical equipment, medical supplies or medical transportation;
(e) children's toys or other portable objects or products specially designed for the feeding, health, hygiene, clothing or education of children;
(f) food or drink;
(g) kitchen utensils or appliances except in military establishments, military locations or military supply depots;
(h) objects clearly of a religious nature;
(i) historic monuments, works of art or places of worship which constitute the cultural or spiritual heritage of peoples;
(j) animals or their carcasses.

The Protocol applies to both international and internal armed conflicts. It prohibits the use of non-detectable anti-personnel mines and their transfer; prohibits the use of non-self-destructing and non-self-deactivating mines outside fenced, monitored and marked areas; broadens obligations of protection in favour of peacekeeping and other missions of the United Nations and its agencies; requires States to enforce compliance with its provisions within their jurisdiction; and calls for penal sanctions in case of violation.

== History ==
The original Protocol was an annex to the 1980 Convention on Certain Conventional Weapons and entered into force on 2 December 1983. The Protocol was amended in Geneva on 3 May 1996, known as Amended Protocol II. The amendment was triggered due to widespread harm caused to by civilians during the Indochina Wars. The convention previously only applied to international conflicts, but the amendment extended the Mines Protocol to also include internal conflicts. The amended version entered into force on 3 December 1998 and as of October 2020 has 106 state parties, which includes 105 United Nations member states plus the Holy See.

The convention has been credited with saving hundreds of thousands of civilian lives since being amended in the 1990s.
