= Lionel Poilâne =

French baker (1945–2002)

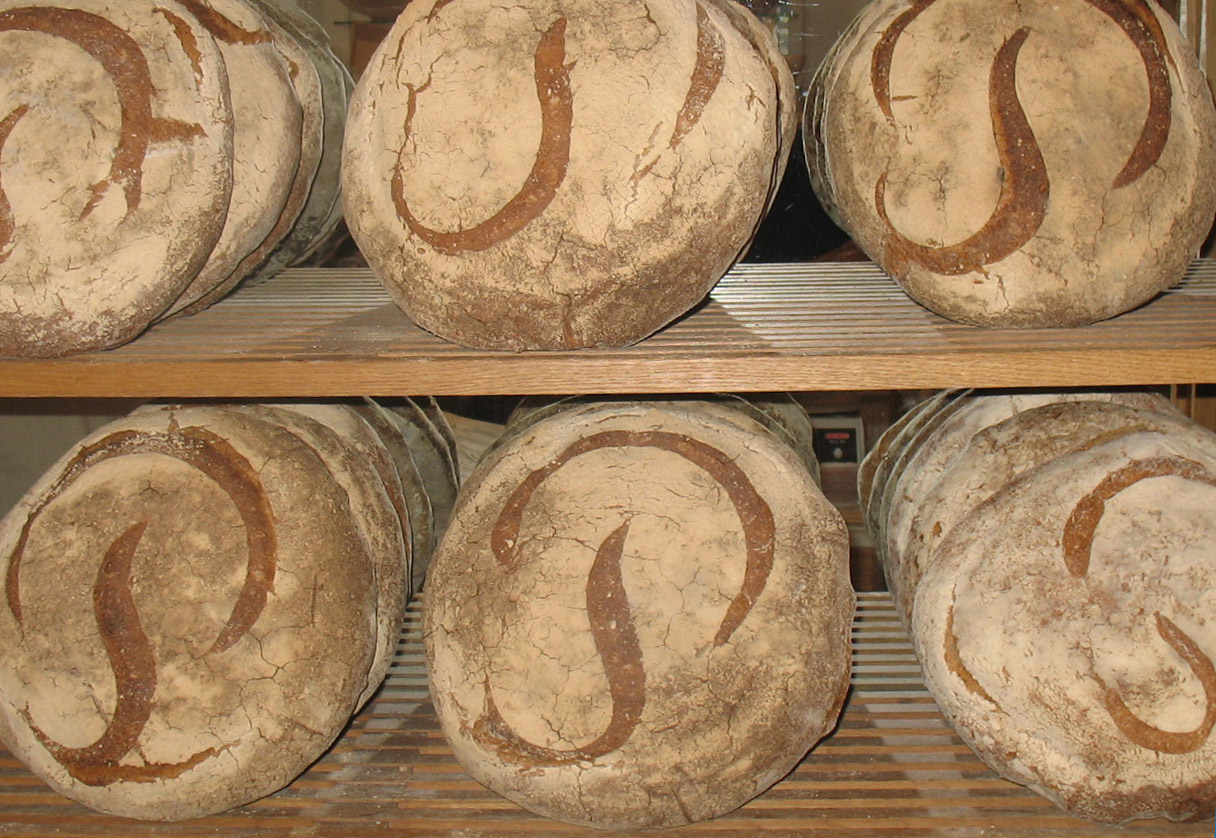
Pain Poilâne (Poilâne bread)

Lionel Poilâne (June 10, 1945 – October 31, 2002) was a French baker and entrepreneur whose commitment to crafting quality bread earned him worldwide renown. His father, Pierre Poilâne started a baking business in 1932, creating bread using stone-ground flour, natural fermentation and a wood-fired oven. Lionel took over the bakery in 1970, continuing the traditional methods.

Poilâne is widely known for a round, two-kilogram sourdough country bread referred to as a miche or pain Poilâne. This bread is often referred to as whole-wheat but in fact is not: the flour used is mostly so-called grey flour of 85% extraction (meaning that some but not all of the wheat bran is retained). According to Poilâne's own website, the dough also contains 30% spelt, an ancestor of wheat.

In addition to miches, the Poilâne bakery offers rye bread, raisin bread, nut bread, Punitions (shortbread cookies), and an assortment of pastries to its clients. Poilâne is perhaps one of the most famous names in the baking industry today.

Poilâne mastered his single product and trained his apprentices in the physical baking process, which he believed to be the most important aspect of his vision. He believed as much of the work as possible should be done by hand, by one person taking responsibility for their loaves from start to finish. Lionel Poilâne laid the basis of a concept he called "retro-innovation"; combining the best of traditional elements together with the best of modern developments. The only deviation from his father's original formula was machine kneading, saving hours of work for his bakers. He was knighted as a Knight of the National Order of Merit for services to the economy in 1993.

Pain Poilâne is produced in the Latin Quarter of Paris where it is sold at the original boulangerie on rue du Cherche-Midi. A second Paris bakery on boulevard de Grenelle is located in the 15th arrondissement. The worldwide demand for Poilâne bread is met in a facility located in Bièvres which was built in the 1980s. The Bièvres bakery produces around 15,000 loaves per day in 24 wood-burning ovens which are exact replicas of the ovens used at the Paris locations. These loaves are shipped worldwide. The firm opened a facility in London's Belgravia district in June 2000.

On October 31, 2002, Lionel Poilâne was killed when the helicopter he was piloting crashed into the bay of Cancale, off the coast of Brittany. The passengers, Poilâne's wife Irena and their dog, also died in the crash. Poilâne was survived by daughters Athena and Apollonia, who now runs the enterprise. Apollonia is a graduate of Harvard University.

Lionel's brother Max Poilâne went his own way and opened his own bakery. There are three Max Poilâne bakery locations in Paris. Bread lovers debate which baker makes the better bread, although Lionel's bread is more famous outside of Paris.
