= PROWLER =

- Manufacturer: Robot Defence Systems
- Country: United States
- Type: Robot mobile sentry gun device
- Purpose: Outdoor robotic sentry/surveillance system

PROWLER was a mid-1980s experimental robot mobile sentry gun device. The name was an acronym standing for "Programmable Robot Observer With Logical Enemy Response".

The Logical Enemy Response was twin M60 machine guns, and a grenade launcher. PROWLER was "the first outdoor robotic sentry/surveillance system."

PROWLER was a six-wheeled vehicle with a gun turret and sensor array, resembling a miniature tank, developed from 1983 onwards. The robot was built by Robot Defence Systems (RDS), an American company from Thornton, Colorado, which has since gone out of business.
