= Zf.Ger.38 =

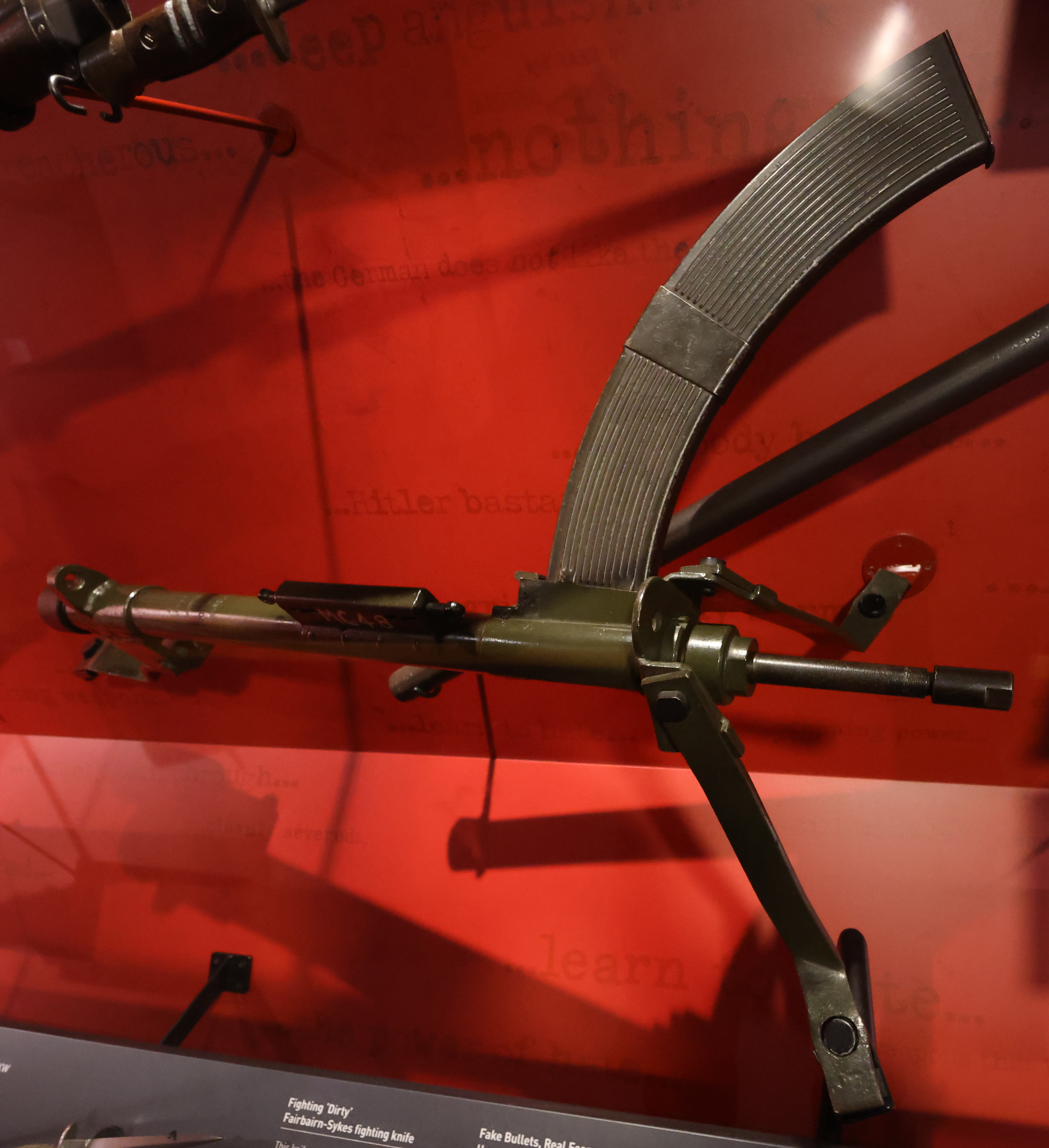
- Zf.Ger.38 at the Royal Armouries Museum in Leeds, United Kingdom
- Type: Machine gun
- Place of origin: Nazi Germany

Production history
- Designed: 1938

Specifications
- Cartridge: 7.92×57mm
- Caliber: 7.92
- Action: Blowback

The Zf.Ger.38 or Zielfeuergerät 38 is a blowback-operated blank-firing machine gun designed and produced by Haenel in 1938, serving the Wehrmacht for training purposes throughout World War II. Utilizing 7.92×57mm wooden bullet blanks, it has a simple yet sturdy construction reduced to the most necessary functioning parts.

Post-war examination by the Allies categorized the Zf.Ger.38 as a “spring gun” or “trip wire-activated static defense machine gun”.
