= Apollonia Poilâne =

American baker, CEO and gallerist

Apollonia Poilâne (born 1984 in New York City) is an American baker, CEO and gallerist based in Paris, France. She is the eldest daughter of Lionel Poilâne and Irena (IBU) Poilâne and sister of artist Athena Poilâne. Together with her sister she owns the Poilâne bakery that has been based at 8 rue du Cherche-Midi in Paris, France since 1932.

The Poilâne bakery is a well-known bakery in paris specializing in sourdough breads baked in wood-fired ovens. It is most famous for their nearly 4lb “miche Poilâne” – a rustic, country style bread introduced to the bakery by Apollonia Poilâne's grandfather, bakery founder Pierre Léon Poilâne.

== Background and early life ==
Apollonia's mother, Irena Poilâne was an architect and after moving to Paris considered herself a “designer” focusing on interior architectural design, sculpting, and jewelry. She was considered a taste-maker throughout Paris and collaborated with the likes of Karl Lagerfeld and Bernardaud ceramics. In his later years, Lionel Poilâne was considered the most-famous and celebrated baker worldwide. Alongside bread baking, he was a celebrity in his own right for and stood as a champion for artisanal craftmanship throughout France. He also cultivated a passion for aeronautics, eventually becoming a helicopter pilot and the President of the Groupement Français de l’Hélicoptère (or G.F.H., the French Helicopter Pilot's Association). From a young age, he found himself collaborating with Salvador Dalí, César and other prominent artists using bread as an inspiration and source material.

Apollonia Poilâne grew up in this environment, educated in her mother's workshops in craftmanship and by her father's in the family's tradition of “the true taste of bread” – which focused not only on bread as food, but how bread touches all aspects of life. Lionel Poilâne had built the bakery into an internationally recognized name, known for the breads produced and his public persona. He is credited with being one of the leaders reviving a focus on artisan breadmaking at a time when industrialized breadmaking dominated and bread consumption was on a decline. He was considered a contemporary of the “nouvelle cuisine” movement and the breads appreciated and utilized by France's top chefs, such as Joel Robuchon and Paul Bocuse.

Together, Irena and Lionel Poilâne, conceived of a “Manufacture” (named for the “main” or “hand” in French and “factory” for production”) just outside of Paris, which houses 24 100-tonne wood fired ovens built to replicate the bakehouse at 8 Rue de Cherche-Midi (NOTE: the word "manufacture/manufactory" is an old one in both English and French - see Manufactory House). By doing so, the bakery could produce up to 5,000 loaves of bread a day, each one baked by a single baker using traditional methods. As such, the bakery had clients worldwide as early as the 1970s, notably in The United States of America and parts of Asia.

== Involvement with family business ==
Asked as a child what she would like to be when she grew up, she responded “Why not be a baker in the morning and an architect the afternoon?” Poilâne grew up playing and working in her mother's workshop and the family's bakery. As a child, Poilâne's spending money came from working at the historic bakery. She formally began working in the family bakery at 16 years old, when Apollonia Poilâne began her apprenticeship as a baker in the bakery's 9-month bakers apprenticeship program. Poilâne's bread baking is known for its physical nature, which relies on the baker to utilize all of their senses and body as the tools. For their sourdough, only mechanical materials are used in the baking process eschewing the use of thermometers or refrigeration – save for use of an electric mixer designed to mimic the human arm movement.

When Apollonia Poilâne was 18, on October 31, 2002, her parents were killed in a helicopter crash. The next morning, the precocious Poilâne entered the bakery and sat behind her father's former business desk, assuming the head of the family business at the age of 18. At the time, Poilâne was already a 13 million euro/year business with three bakeries in Paris, one location in London, and an e-commerce website that had existed since 1997. It accounted between 1 and 2.5% of bread found in Paris and its surrounding areas restaurants as well as being a supplier to the Palace Elysée the Presidential Palace.

In 2019, she published Poilâne: The Secrets of the World-Famous Bread Bakery (ISBN 978-1328810786), which includes recipes for several of the bakery's breads and pastries.

In June 2025 Poilâne's production facility in Bièvres, Essonne, was shut down by health authorities due to serious hygiene and food safety violations such as presence of dead mice, mice urine and poop, crawling and flying insects as well as its larvae. It remained closed for over a month. In January 2026 the company entered redressement judiciaire (administration) due to financial difficulties, although it continued operating.

== Education ==
A year after becoming the head of the family business, Apollonia started, and completed in 2007, a degree in economics at Harvard University. She used the time difference between Cambridge, Massachusetts and Paris, France in order to run the business while being a student at Harvard College.
