= Sentry gun =

Weapon that automatically aims and fires at targets

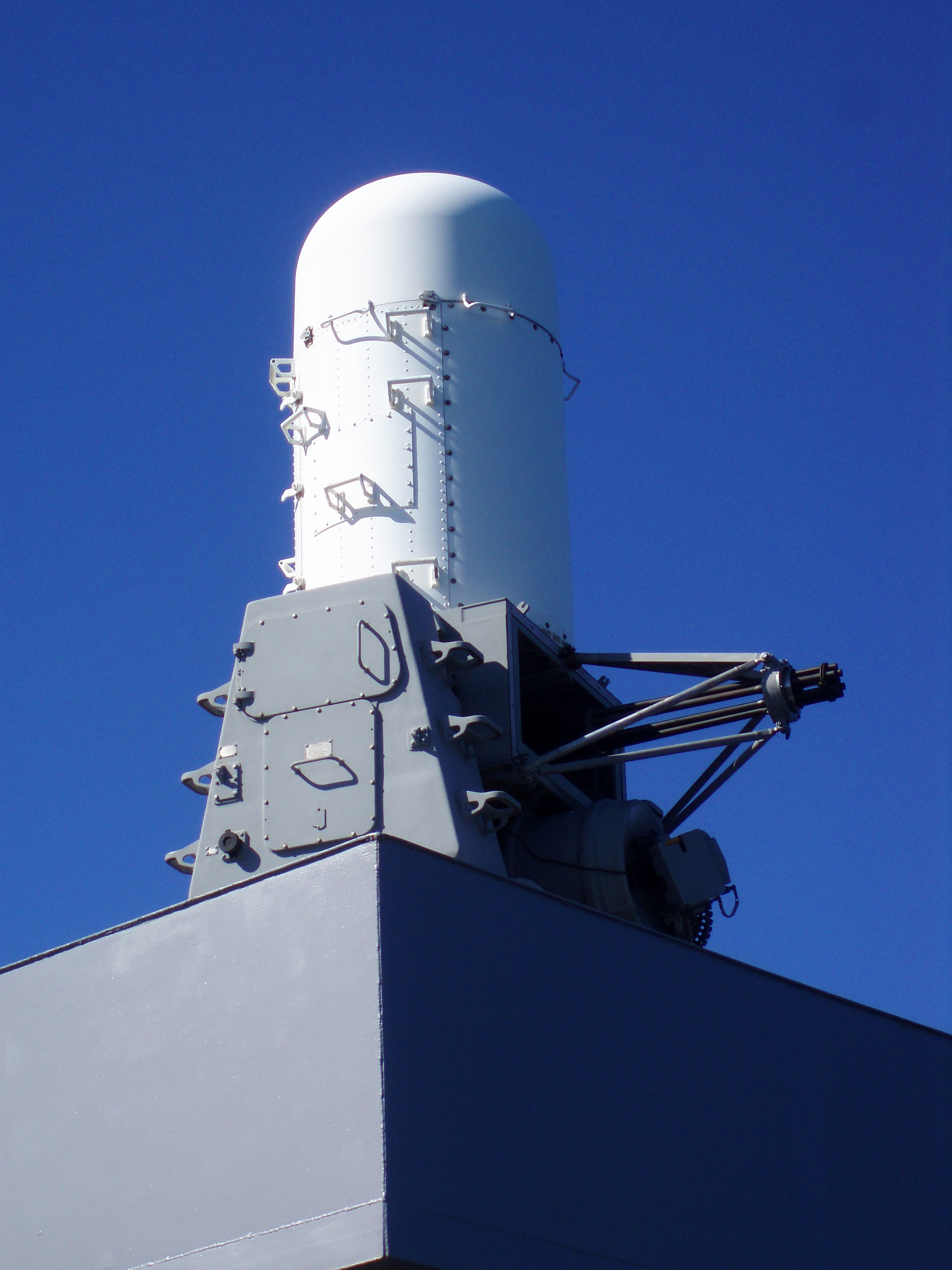
Phalanx automated turret, mounted on USS Denver

A sentry gun is a weapon that automatically aims and fires at targets that are detected by sensors. The earliest functioning military sentry guns were the close-in weapon systems point-defense weapons, such as the Phalanx CIWS, used for detecting and destroying short range incoming missiles and enemy aircraft, first used exclusively on naval assets, and now also as land-based defenses.

== Military use ==
=== Samsung SGR-A1 ===
The Samsung SGR-A1 is a South Korean military robot sentry designed to replace human counterparts in the demilitarized zone at the South and North Korean border. It is a stationary system made by Samsung defense subsidiary Samsung Techwin.

=== Sentry Tech ===
In 2007, the Israeli military deployed the Sentry Tech system, dubbed as the Roah-Yora (Sees-Fires) by the IDF along the Gaza border fence with pillboxes placed at intervals of some hundreds of meters. The 4-million USD (3.35 million Euro) system was completed in late spring of 2008. The weapon system mounts a .50BMG automated M2 Browning machine gun and a SPIKE guided missile in each pillbox covered by an opaque protective shield. The weapon is operated by one soldier and fed information from cameras, long range electro-optical sensors, ground sensors, crewed aircraft, and overhead drones, as well as radar. Connected via fiber optics to a remote operator station and a command-and-control center, each machine gun-mounted station serves as a type of robotic sniper, capable of enforcing a nearly 1,500-meter-deep area of denial. The gun is based on the Samson Remote Controlled Weapon Station. The weapon is capable of acquiring targets and maintaining a firing solution independently, but still requires human input to fire or release ordnance.

Dozens of people have been shot with the Sentry Tech system. The first reported killing of an individual appears to have taken place during Operation Cast Lead in December 2008. According to Israeli sources, the process to authorize a kill is "complex" but can still be carried out in under two minutes. The same sources report that the weapons are mainly used for "warning shots" if they are fired at all, since the mere opening of the protective dome is often enough to intimidate any potential contacts into retreat.

=== Super aEgis II ===
In December 2010, the South Korean firm DoDAAM unveiled the Super aEgis II, an automated turret-based weapon platform that uses thermal imaging to lock onto vehicles or humans up to 3 km away. It is able to function during nighttime and is unaffected by weather conditions. The system gives a verbal warning before firing, and though it is capable of firing automatically, the company reports that all of its customers have configured it to require human confirmation. It is used at various facilities in Qatar and the United Arab Emirates, including Abu Dhabi, among other places, and has been tested in the Korean Demilitarized Zone.

=== Bullfrog ===
In response to increasing attacks using drones on US military personnel abroad, the United States Department of Defense tested an artificial intelligence-enabled sentry gun system developed by Allen Control Systems known as the "Bullfrog" in 2024. The system consists of an M240 machine gun mounted on a rotating turret with an electro-optical sensor, proprietary AI and computer vision software.

=== Sky Sentinel ===
In May 2025, Ukraine unveiled an AI operated turret, called Sky Sentinel, fitted to an M2 Browning machine gun that shot down its first Shahed drone without human input using radar. The system costs around $150,000 per turret and some 10 to 30 turrets are required to protect a small town from drones. In 2025, a crowdfunding effort was underway to purchase more turrets.

== See also ==
- Gun-powered mousetrap – 1882 mousetrap design
- Lethal autonomous weapons (LAWs)
- Remote weapon station
- SM-70
- Spring-gun
- CIWS

Specific systems

- Goalkeeper CIWS
- PROWLER
- XTR-101/102
