= Amappo =

Hunting trap used by Ainu people

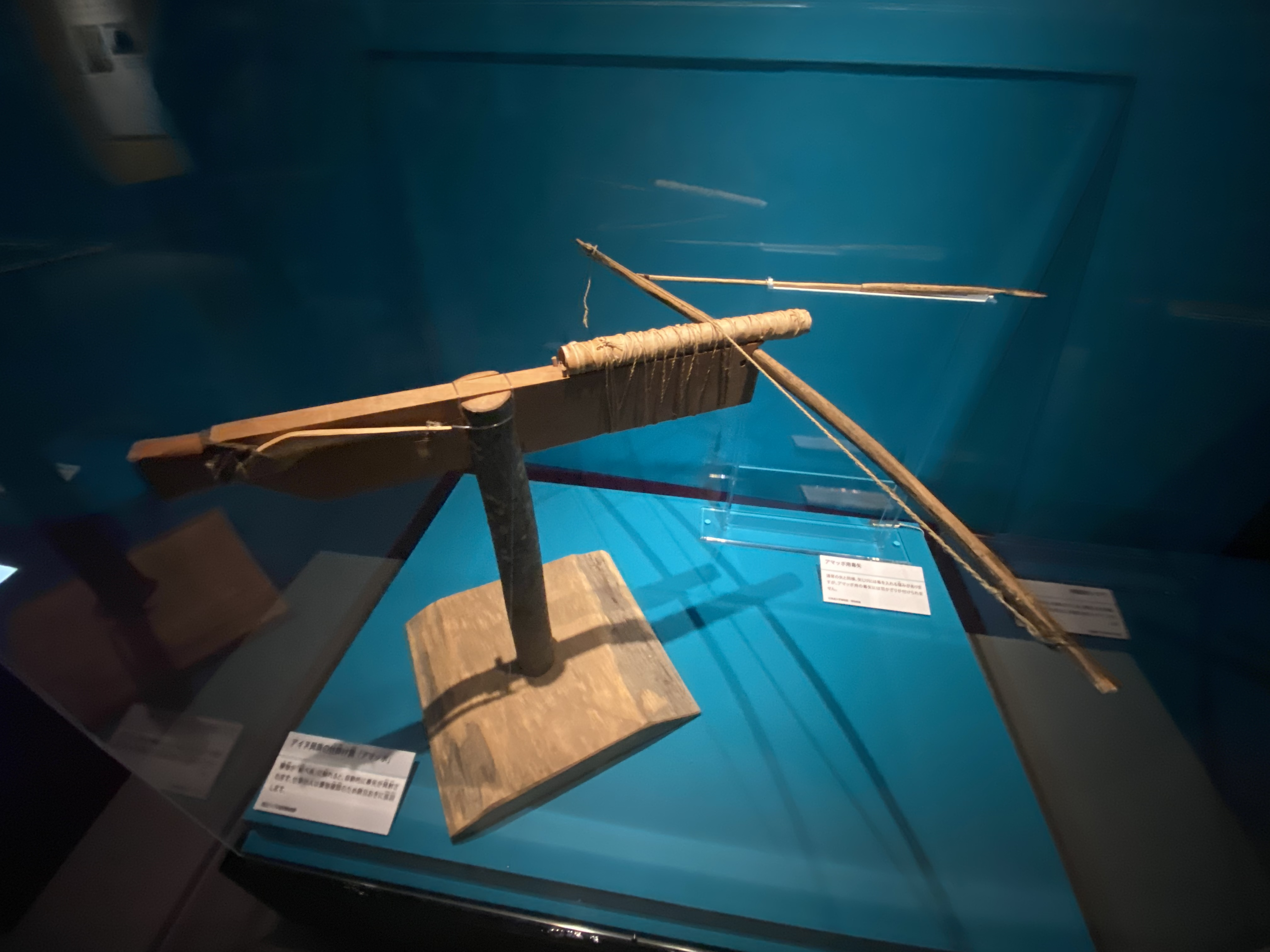
A replica amappo on display at the Osaka Museum of Natural History

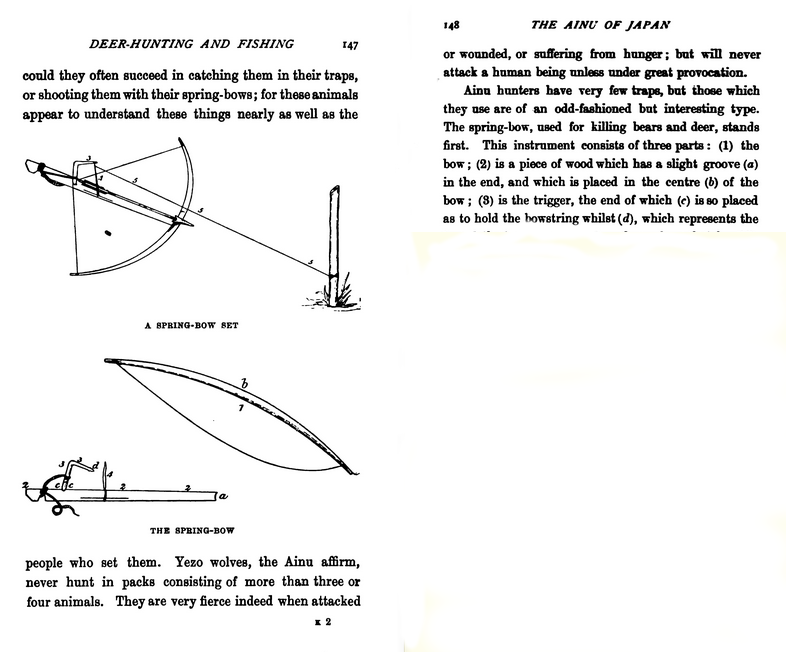
John Batchelor (1854-1944), "The Ainu of Japan", 1892, classic horizontal amappo

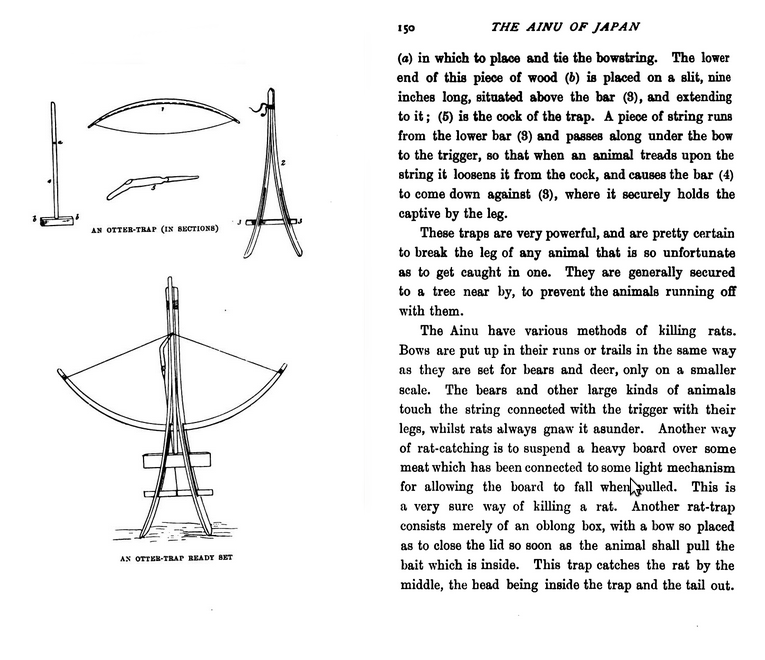
Ibid., vertical amappo for otter

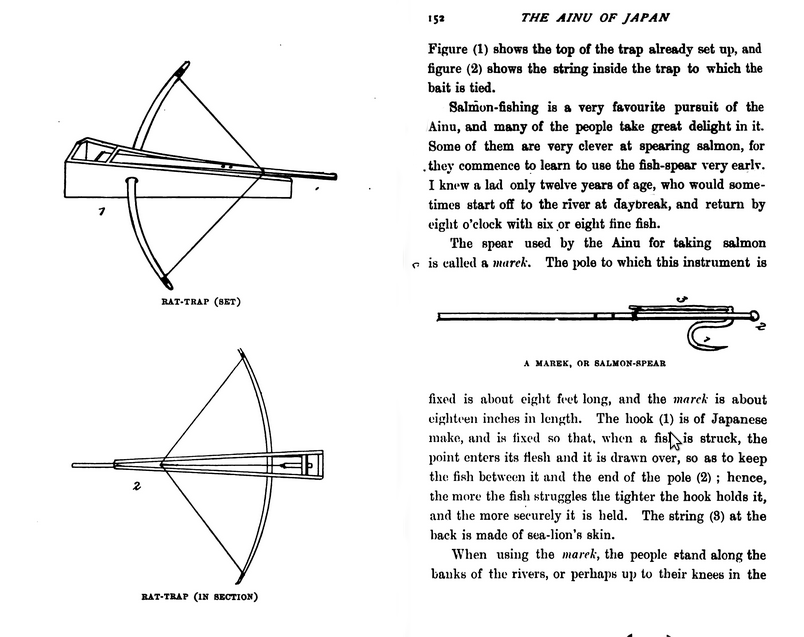
Ibid., amappo rat trap

An amappo (アマッポ; lit. 'thing that is set up') was a traditional bear and deer hunters' trap of the Ainu people of the northern Japanese archipelago and Sakhalin.

== Summary ==
Mechanically, the amappo was a simple crossbow of elastic yew wood set in a notch at the top of a short post or tree stump. A stump prepared for this purpose was called a kútek (クテｸ). A release mechanism actuated by a tripwire was strung across a game trail. When an animal traversing the path disturbed the tripwire, a loaded arrow was released. These arrows were wrapped in birchbark to protect them from rain, marked with an ikashishiroshi (イカシシロシ), or family symbol, to indicate ownership of the kill, and coated with a paste of surku (スㇽク), a lethal poison derived from aconitum ground in a mortar and pestle specially set aside for the purpose. This style of trap originated in eastern Siberia. On the Japanese archipelago, amappo are believed to have been in use since at least the Neolithic period.

In the early Meiji era, the setting of amappo was banned by the Kaitakushi in favor of hunting by firearm.

== Use ==
Hunting by amappo was usually carried out in spring and autumn, when dense foliage made sighting prey more difficult and cold weather slowed the decomposition of carcasses.

The elevation of the tripwire was adjusted depending on the animal being targeted in order to improve the chance of the arrow striking the heart. For example, a tripwire for deer would be strung roughly 10 cm (3.9 in) higher than that for a bear.

A number of methods were developed to prevent passersby from inadvertently tripping an amappo. For one, the tripwire was typically allowed a degree of slack so that the trajectory of a released arrow would pass behind the thigh of a standing person. Another technique was to carve images of bows and arrows into nearby tree trunks to warn about the presence of an amappo.

== Preparation, efficacy, and handling of surku ==
Although many recipes for surku were handed down by different Ainu villages, aconitum was always the base. Aconitum roots and stalks gathered in the mountains were allowed to dry for at least one month before being ground and mixed with water. Once the paste was ready, a very small amount would be placed on the tongue and the strength of the poison would be estimated by the resulting pain.

If the level of toxicity was too low, even if the arrow hit the target, the prey would escape. Conversely, if the toxicity was too strong, the poison would spread throughout the prey's body, rendering its meat inedible. Furthermore, in cases of excessive toxicity, the animal's fur would soon fall out, ruining even the pelt. However, when hunters faced a man-eating animal (ウェンカムイ, wenkamuy), the greatest possible level of toxicity was used as the meat and pelts of such animals were taboo.

According to information obtained by the surgeon Sekiba Fujihiko from the Ainu of the Saru River and Hidaka Mountains, brown bears poisoned with surku initially react violently but gradually become quiet, stiffening their limbs and foaming at the mouth before dying after about two hours. If the surku was formulated to have stronger toxicity, it will kill within one hour.

The meat of animals killed by surku could be eaten as long as "a fistful" of tissue was gouged out from around the site of the arrow impact and discarded. However, even the remaining meat could never be eaten raw, and needed to be cooked.

== See also ==
- Spring-gun
