= Katko v. Briney =

Court case decided by the Iowa Supreme Court

- Court: Iowa Supreme Court
- Full case name: Marvin Katko v. Edward Briney and Bertha L. Briney
- Decided: February 9, 1971
- Citation: 183 N.W.2d 657

Case history
- Appealed from: Iowa District Court for the 8th Judicial District

Court membership
- Judges sitting: Chief Justice; C. Edwin Moore; Associate Justices; Robert L. Larson · William Corwin Stuart · M. L. Mason · Francis H. Becker · Warren J. Rees · Maurice E. Rawlings · Clay LeGrand · Harvey Uhlenhopp

Case opinions
- Landowner had a duty not to set potentially deadly traps for trespassers.
- Decision by: Moore
- Dissent: Larson

Katko v. Briney, 183 N.W.2d 657 (Iowa 1971), is a court case decided by the Iowa Supreme Court, in which homeowners Edward and Bertha Briney were held liable for battery for injuries caused to trespasser Marvin Katko, who set off a spring gun set as a mantrap in an uninhabited house on their property. The case thereafter received wide attention in legal circles, becoming a staple of tort law casebooks and law school courses.

== Factual background ==
Bertha Briney inherited an old farmhouse in Mahaska County, Iowa, which the Brineys had left vacant for the last ten years before the incident. They boarded it up and placed "No Trespassing" signs around the property. The farmhouse was in poor condition and was subject to frequent burglaries and break-ins.

Marvin Katko worked regularly as a gasoline station attendant in Eddyville, seven miles from the Brineys' farmhouse. In 1967, the area around the house was covered with high weeds; Katko had observed it for several years while hunting in the area and considered it to be abandoned. Before July 16, 1967, Katko and his friend Marvin McDonough had been to the premises and found several old bottles and fruit jars which they stole and added to their collection of antiques.

To defend the house against further intruders and theft, Edward Briney mounted a 20-gauge spring-loaded shotgun in the farmhouse and rigged it to fire when the north bedroom door was opened. Bertha suggested aiming the gun downward to shoot towards an intruder's legs, rather than cause a mortal injury. Edward Briney also covered the bedroom window with steel.

On July 16, 1967, Katko and McDonough again entered the farmhouse with the intent to steal more old bottles and dated fruit jars that Katko considered antiques. When Katko entered the bedroom, he tripped the trigger mechanism and the shotgun fired into his right leg at point-blank range. Much of Katko's leg, including part of the tibia, was blown away. Only by McDonough's assistance did Katko get out of the house. The gunshot wound was sufficiently severe to require hospitalization, where Katko remained for 40 days.

== Opinion of the Court ==
Garold Heslinga of Oskaloosa, Iowa, was the attorney for the appellee (Katko) and Bruce Palmer and H.S. Life, also of Oskaloosa, represented the appellants (Brineys).

The Court ruled that using deadly force on intruders in an unoccupied property was not reasonable or justified and therefore not a defense to the tort of battery. Briney would have been justified in defending himself with the shotgun if he had been home during the intrusion. The plaintiff's status as a trespasser is irrelevant when assessing liability in this case.

The case is notable for the proposition that, although a landowner has no duty to make his property safe for trespassers, he may not set deadly traps against them, holding that "the law has always placed a higher value upon human safety than upon mere rights in property." The court thus ruled for Katko, entering judgment for $20,000 in actual damages and $10,000 in punitive damages.

== Aftermath ==
The Brineys sold 80 of their 120 acres (0.49 km^{2}) to pay the judgment while proceeding with an appeal. Three of the Brineys’ neighbors bought the property at auction, paying $1 more than the minimum bid of $10,000. After the appeal was denied, they made a leaseback arrangement with the Brineys, but eventually one sold his share to his son for a profit. The Brineys and Katko then joined in a lawsuit against the neighbor to create a constructive trust on the profit, but the case was settled before trial in an amount sufficient to close out the judgment against the Brineys.

As Katko's injury was misreported by the United Press International wire service as having taken place in the Briney residence, several states introduced what were called "Briney Bills" for self-defense, which was not an issue in the case. The Nebraska Legislature act, stating that "no person ... shall be placed in ... jeopardy ... for protecting, by any means necessary, himself, his family, or his real estate property", was overturned due to improper delegation of sentencing authority in State v. Goodseal (1971).

Four years after the case was decided, Edward Briney was asked if he would change anything about the situation. Briney replied, "There's one thing I'd do different, though: I'd have aimed that gun a few feet higher." Marvin Katko's own home was burgled in 1976, with burglars making off with several valuables. Katko later ended his own life on November 15, 1994, using a gun in the front yard of his home.

== See also ==
- Castle doctrine
- Tony Martin (farmer)
