= Spring-gun =

Automatically-triggered gun trap

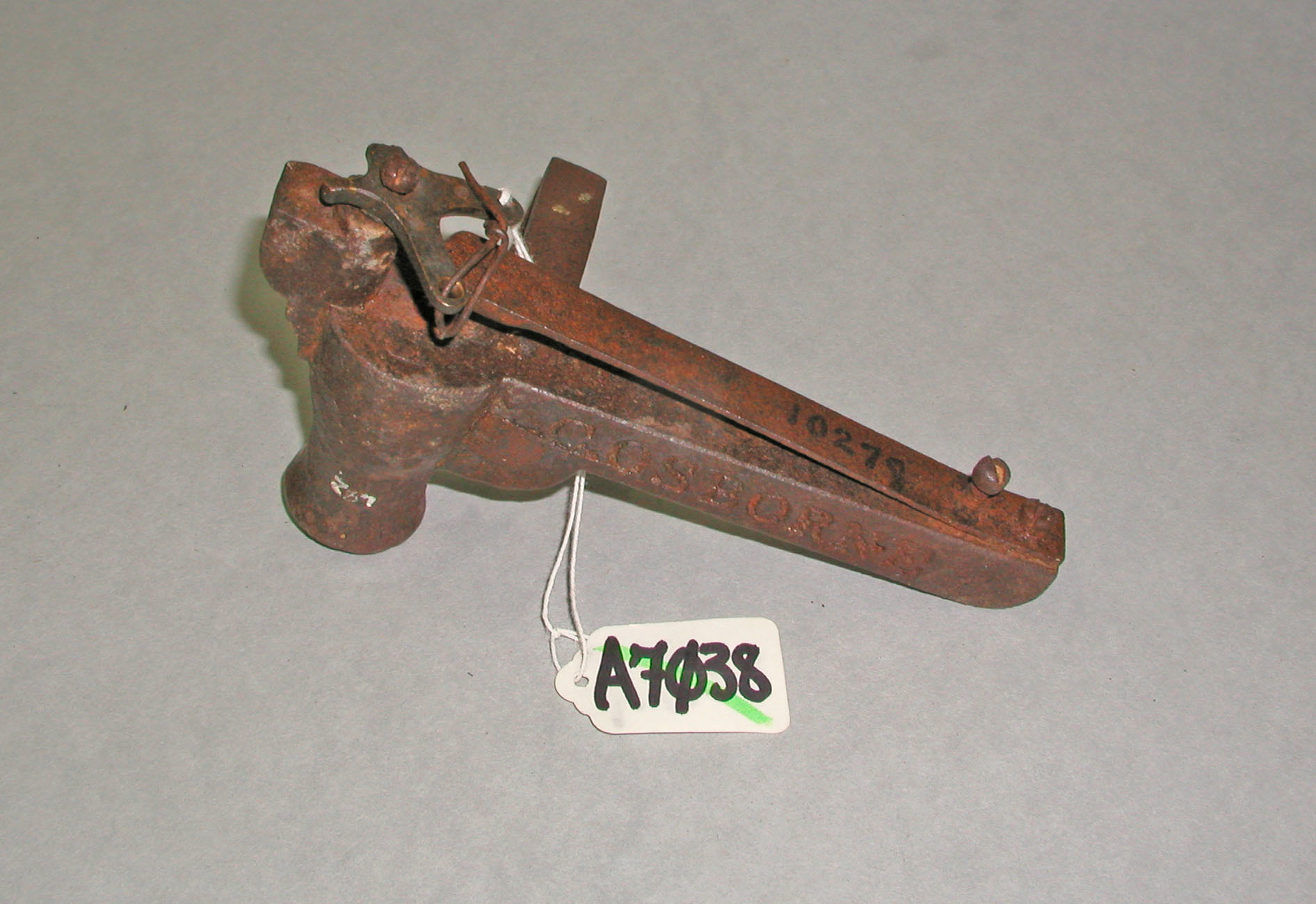
A spring alarm gun used as an anti-poaching device in the Bay of Islands in New Zealand. The device has a solid bracket for attaching to a post, and a triggering device with tripwire arms.

A spring-gun, also known as a booby trap gun, is a gun, often a shotgun, rigged to fire when a string or other triggering device is tripped by contact of sufficient force to "spring" the trigger so that anyone stumbling over or treading on it would discharge the gun. Setting or maintaining a spring-gun is illegal in many places.

== Uses ==
Spring-guns were formerly used as booby traps against poachers and trespassers. Since 1827, spring-guns and all man-traps have been illegal in England. Spring-guns are sometimes used to trap animals. Although there have been few reported cases of use, there have been several unconfirmed cases over the 20th century.

In the 18th century, spring-guns were often used to protect graveyards, offering an alarm system of sorts to protect newly buried bodies, which were often stolen by grave-robbers who supplied anatomists with cadavers.

Spring-guns were often set to protect property. For this purpose, spring-guns are often placed in busy corridors such as near doors. A trespasser opening the door completely would then be shot. Residents who are aware of the trap use a different door or open the door halfway and disconnect the tripwire. To reduce fatalities by using this trap, non-lethal calibers are often used, or the spring-gun is fitted to fire less lethal ammunition.

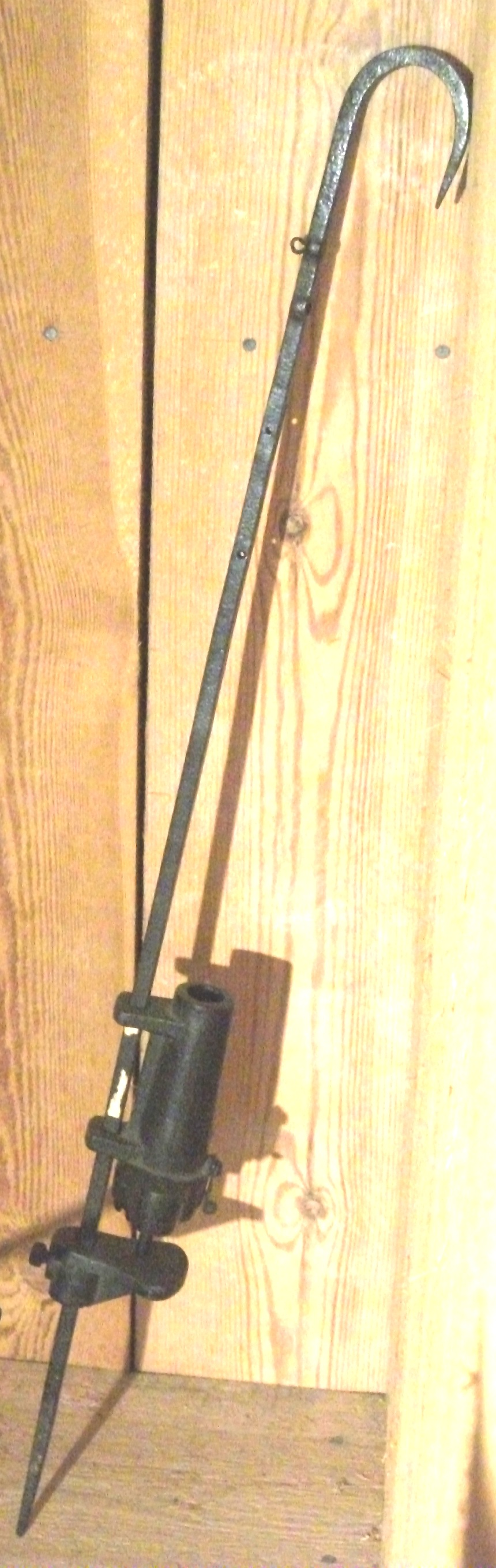
Non-lethal spring-gun as alarm

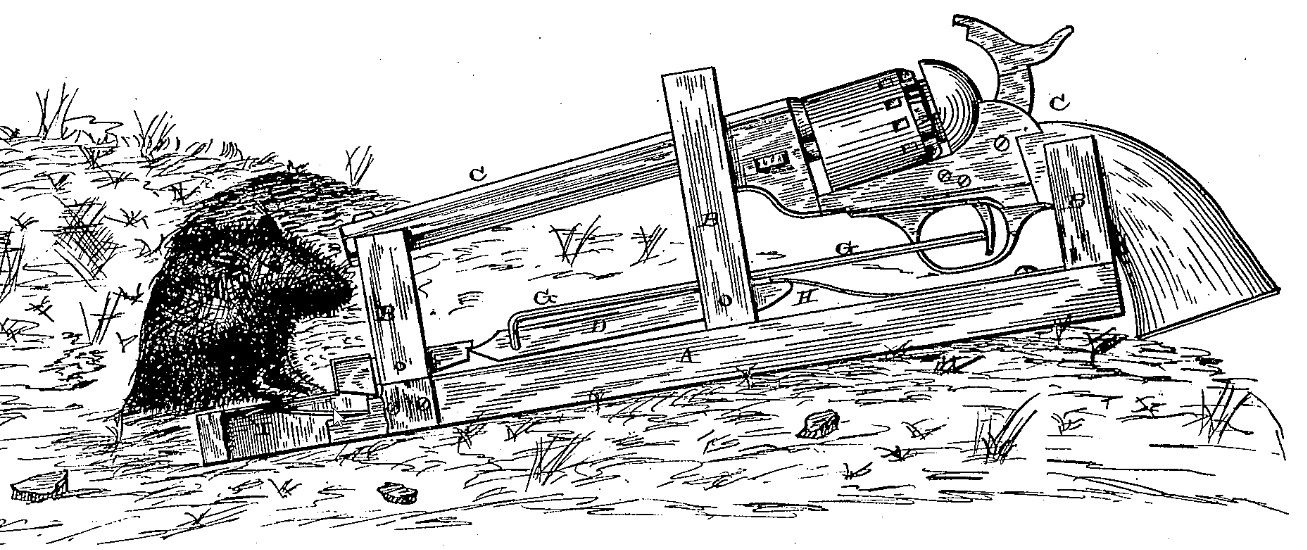
US patent for a spring-gun mousetrap

For example, in the United States, most spring-guns are loaded with non-lethal caliber or shot to avoid liability arising from the use of deadly force in the protection of a property interest. Posting clear and unmistakable warning signs as well as making entry to spring-gun guarded premises difficult for innocent persons, such as high walls, fences and natural obstacles, are significant ways to reduce potential tort liability arising from the spring gun's wounding of a careless or criminal intruder. Important US lawsuits regarding trespassers wounded by spring-guns include Katko v. Briney. Bird v. Holbrook is an 1825 English case also of great relevance, where a spring-gun set to protect a tulip garden injured a trespasser who was recovering a stray bird. The man who set the spring-gun was liable for the damage caused.

Another example was the Zf.Ger.38 used for training, originally intended to fire blank rounds, however it was later used for static defence.

== Documented examples ==
An historic use of a spring-gun occurred during the night of June 3 or early morning of June 4, 1775, when a spring-gun set by the British to protect the military stores in the Magazine in Williamsburg, Virginia, wounded two young men who had broken in. The subsequent outrage by the local population proved to be the final act of the Gunpowder Incident, leading Governor Dunmore to flee the city to a British warship and declare the Commonwealth of Virginia in a state of rebellion.

In 1981, Rene Seiptius and two friends attempted to flee from East Germany to West Germany. While they managed to avoid land mines, they did trip a spring-gun, killing one of Rene's friends.

In 1990, one man in a group of four burglars was killed during a burglary by a spring-gun that was set up by a business owner in Colorado. The business had been burglarized eight times during the previous two years, including at least one previous burglary by the man who died. The man who set the trap pled guilty to manslaughter. To deter thefts, other businesses in the area put up signs claiming their premises were also booby trapped, with the unintended result that firefighters and other emergency personnel would refuse to enter these buildings during emergencies until they could be assured of their safety.

== Alternatives ==
Alternative traps are mines such as gas mines or the directional mine, such as the SM-70, which was used on the inner German border to prevent refugees from escaping East Germany. Crowd-control munitions and gas mines can be less lethal, while concussion mines are meant to kill. The latter are thus only used in military perimeter defenses.

== See also ==
- Anti-handling device
- Area denial
- Cartridge trap
- Mantrap
- Booby trap
- Katko v. Briney
- Sentry gun
