= Mantrap (snare) =

Trap for catching humans

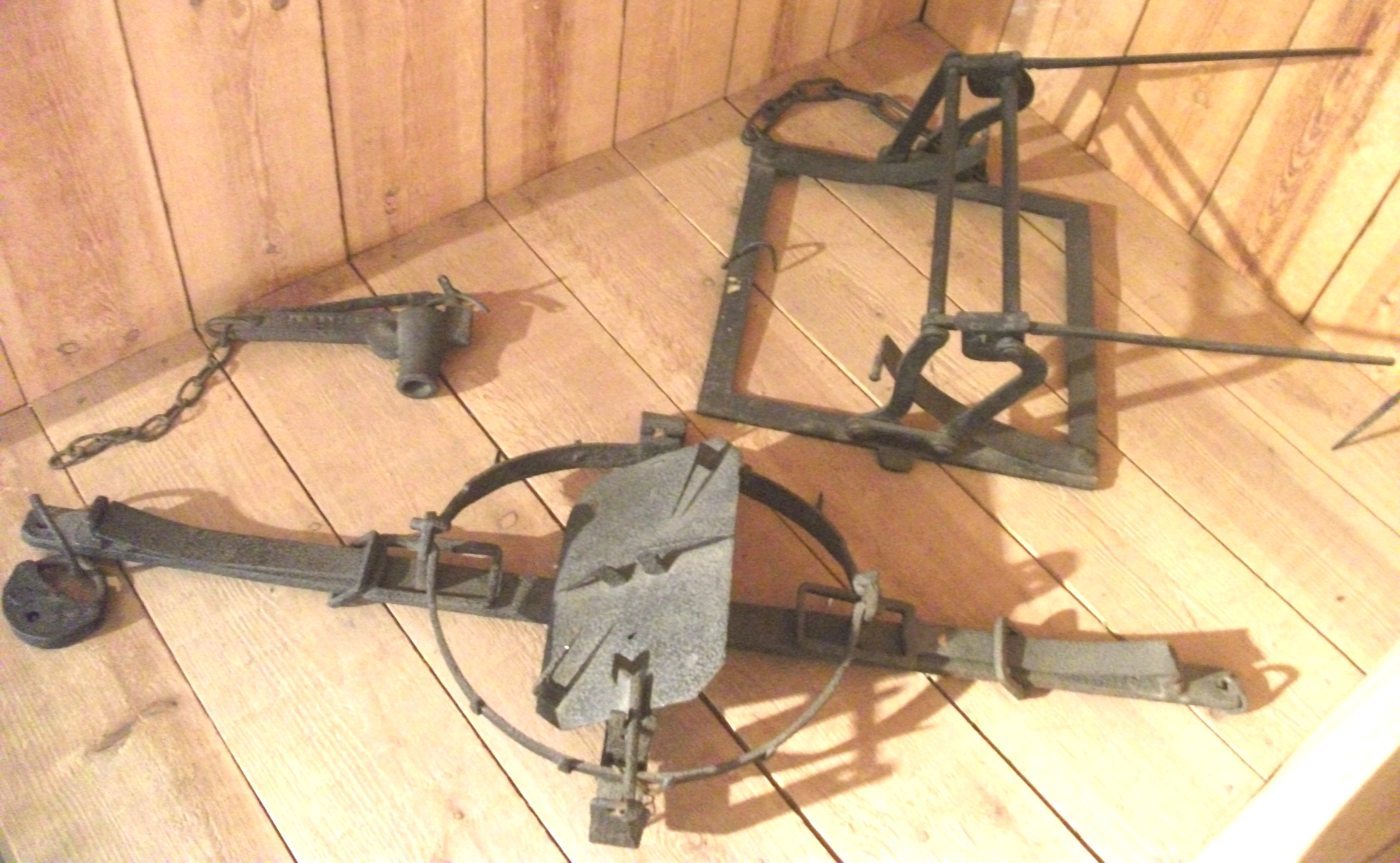
Two mantraps (one a "humane" type) and a spring gun

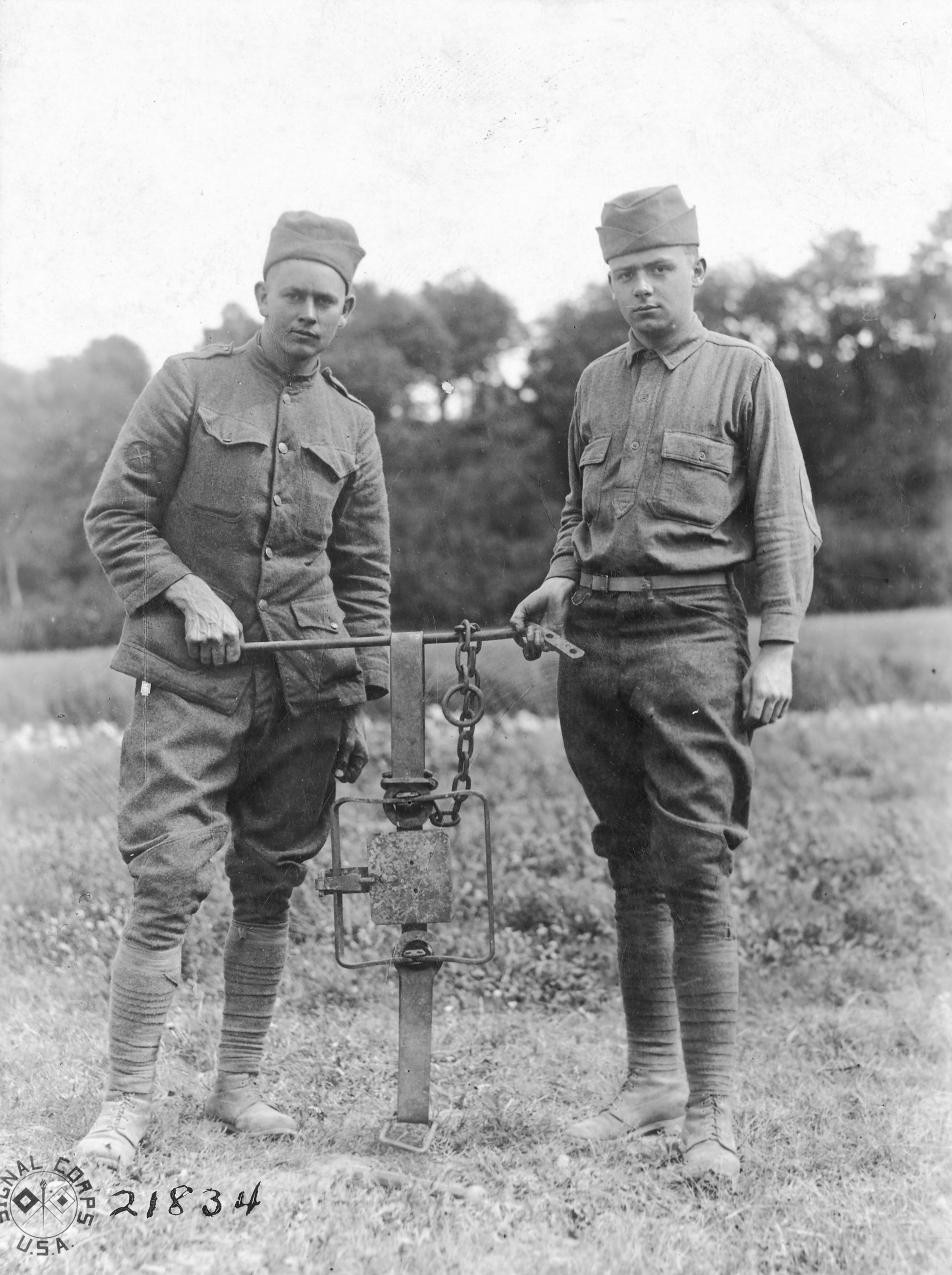
Two soldiers with a mantrap found in No man's land during World War I

A mantrap (also written as man-trap and man trap) is a mechanical physical security device for catching poachers, art thieves and other trespassers. They have taken many forms, the most usual being similar to a large foothold trap, the steel springs being armed with teeth which meet in the person's leg. In 1827, they were made illegal in England, except in houses between sunset and sunrise as a defence against burglars.

Other traps such as special snares, trap netting, trapping pits, fluidizing solid matter traps and cage traps could be used.

Mantraps that use deadly force are illegal in the United States, and in notable tort law cases the trespasser has successfully sued the property owner for damages caused by the mantrap. There is also the possibility that such traps could endanger emergency service personnel such as firefighters who must forcefully enter such buildings during emergencies. As noted in the important American court case of Katko v. Briney, "the law has always placed a higher value upon human safety than upon mere rights of property".

== See also ==
- Animal trapping
- Amappo
- Spring-gun
- Mantrap (access control)
