= Cartridge trap =

Type of booby trap

A cartridge trap is a very simple trap, made from four main components: a bamboo pipe, a piece of wood, a nail and a small arms cartridge.

== See also ==
- Combat engineer – Soldier who performs military engineering
- NLF and PAVN battle tactics – North Vietnamese and Viet Cong tactics in the Vietnam War
- Punji stick – Booby-trapped stake or spike
